= Billboard Music Award for Top Duo/Group =

Annual American music award

The Billboard Music Award for Top Duo/Group was first presented in 1998 to American R&B music trio Next. British boy band One Direction held the record for most wins in the category, with three as of the 2016 BBMAs, until the 2022 edition, when South Korean group BTS earned their third win and tied for the lead.

== Winners and nominees ==
Winners are listed first and highlighted in bold.

=== 1990s ===
Year	Artist	Ref.
1998	**Next**	
1998	K-Ci & JoJo	
1998	Savage Garden	
1998	Third Eye Blind	
1999	**Backstreet Boys**	
1999	98 Degrees	
1999	Sugar Ray	
1999	TLC	

=== 2000s ===
Year	Artist	Ref
2000	**Destiny's Child**	
2001	**Destiny's Child**	
2002	**Creed**	
2002	Linkin Park	
2002	Nickelback	
2002	Puddle of Mudd	
2003	**3 Doors Down**	
2003	Dixie Chicks	
2003	Linkin Park	
2003	Matchbox Twenty	
2004	**Outkast**	
2004	Hoobastank	
2004	Linkin Park	
2004	Maroon 5	
2005	**Green Day**	
2005	The Black Eyed Peas	
2005	Destiny's Child	
2005	The Killers	
2006	**Nickelback**	
2006	The Fray	
2006	The Pussycat Dolls	
2006	Rascal Flatts	
2007 – 09	—N/a	

=== 2010s ===
Year	Artist	Ref
2010	—N/a	
2011	**The Black Eyed Peas**	
2011	Bon Jovi	
2011	Lady Antebellum	
2011	Linkin Park	
2011	U2	
2012	**LMFAO**	
2012	The Black Eyed Peas	
2012	Coldplay	
2012	Lady Antebellum	
2012	Maroon 5	
2013	**One Direction**	
2013	Coldplay	
2013	Fun	
2013	Maroon 5	
2013	Mumford & Sons	
2014	**Imagine Dragons**	
2014	Florida Georgia Line	
2014	Macklemore & Ryan Lewis	
2014	One Direction	
2014	OneRepublic	
2015	**One Direction**	
2015	5 Seconds of Summer	
2015	Florida Georgia Line	
2015	Magic!	
2015	Maroon 5	
2016	**One Direction**	
2016	Maroon 5	
2016	The Rolling Stones	
2016	Twenty One Pilots	
2016	U2	
2017	**Twenty One Pilots**	
2017	The Chainsmokers	
2017	Coldplay	
2017	Florida Georgia Line	
2017	Guns N' Roses	
2018	**Imagine Dragons**	
2018	The Chainsmokers	
2018	Coldplay	
2018	Migos	
2018	U2	
2019	**BTS**	
2019	Imagine Dragons	
2019	Dan + Shay	
2019	Maroon 5	
2019	Panic! at the Disco	

=== 2020s ===
Year	Artist	Ref
2020	**Jonas Brothers**	
2020	BTS	
2020	Dan + Shay	
2020	Maroon 5	
2020	Panic! at the Disco	
2021	**BTS**	
2021	AC/DC	
2021	AJR	
2021	Dan + Shay	
2021	Maroon 5	
2022	**BTS**	
2022	Glass Animals	
2022	Imagine Dragons	
2022	Migos	
2022	Silk Sonic	
2023	**Fuerza Regida**	
2023	Eslabon Armado	
2023	Fifty Fifty	
2023	Grupo Frontera	
2023	Metallica	
2024	**Fuerza Regida**	
2024	Blink-182	
2024	Coldplay	
2024	Linkin Park	
2024	Stray Kids	

== Multiple wins and nominations ==
=== Wins ===
3 wins

- One Direction
- BTS

2 wins

- Destiny's Child
- Fuerza Regida
- Imagine Dragons

=== Nominations ===
8 nominations

- Maroon 5

5 nominations

- Coldplay
- Linkin Park

4 nominations

- BTS
- Coldplay
- Imagine Dragons
- One Direction

3 nominations

- The Black Eyed Peas
- Dan + Shay
- Destiny's Child
- Florida Georgia Line
- U2

2 nominations

- The Chainsmokers
- Fuerza Regida
- Lady Antebellum
- Migos
- Nickelback
- Panic! at the Disco
- Twenty One Pilots
