= Billboard Music Award for Top Touring Artist =

Annual American music award

This article lists the winners and nominees for the Billboard Music Award for Top Touring Artist. This award has been given out since 2011 and currently U2 hold the record for most wins in this category with three.

Due to the COVID-19 pandemic, no awards were given in 2021. Since then, it has not been reinstated but other touring category awards have been awarded, including Top R&B Tour, Top Latin Touring Artist and Top Rap Tour.

== Winners and nominees ==
Winners are listed first and highlighted in bold.

=== 2010s ===
Year	Artist	Ref.
2011	**U2**	
2011	Bon Jovi	
2011	Michael Bublé	
2011	Lady Gaga	
2011	Roger Waters	
2012	**U2**	
2012	Bon Jovi	
2012	Taylor Swift	
2012	Take That	
2012	Roger Waters	
2013	**Madonna**	
2013	Coldplay	
2013	Lady Gaga	
2013	Bruce Springsteen	
2013	Roger Waters	
2014	**Bon Jovi**	
2014	Beyoncé	
2014	P!nk	
2014	Rihanna	
2014	Bruce Springsteen & The E Street Band	
2015	**One Direction**	
2015	Lady Gaga	
2015	Katy Perry	
2015	The Rolling Stones	
2015	Justin Timberlake	
2016	**Taylor Swift**	
2016	Madonna	
2016	One Direction	
2016	The Rolling Stones	
2016	U2	
2017	**Beyoncé**	
2017	Justin Bieber	
2017	Coldplay	
2017	Guns N' Roses	
2017	Bruce Springsteen	
2018	**U2**	
2018	Bruno Mars	
2018	Coldplay	
2018	Ed Sheeran	
2018	Guns N' Roses	
2019	**Ed Sheeran**	
2019	Beyoncé & Jay-Z	
2019	Bruno Mars	
2019	Justin Timberlake	
2019	Taylor Swift	

=== 2020s ===
Year	Artist	Ref.
2020	**Pink**	
2020	Elton John	
2020	Metallica	
2020	The Rolling Stones	
2020	Ed Sheeran	

== Multiple wins and nominations ==
=== Wins ===
3 wins

- U2

=== Nominations ===
4 nominations

- U2

3 nominations

- Bon Jovi
- Roger Waters
- Lady Gaga
- Bruce Springsteen
- Taylor Swift
- The Rolling Stones
- Ed Sheeran

2 nominations

- Beyoncé
- Bruno Mars
- Coldplay
- Madonna
- One Direction
- Pink
