= 2012 Billboard Music Awards =

Annual American music awards ceremony

- Date: May 20, 2012
- Location: MGM Grand Garden Arena, Las Vegas, Nevada, U.S.
- Hosted by: Julie Bowen; Ty Burrell

Highlights
- Most awards: Adele (12)
- Most nominations: LMFAO (22)

Television/radio coverage
- Network: ABC

The 2012 Billboard Music Awards is a music award ceremony that was held on May 20, 2012 at the MGM Grand Garden Arena in Las Vegas, Nevada. It aired live on ABC at 8:00/7:00 PM central. The show was hosted by Modern Family's Julie Bowen and Ty Burrell.

The awards recognized the most popular artists and albums from 2011.

== Performances ==
Artist(s)	Song(s)
LMFAO	"Party Rock Anthem" "Sorry for Party Rocking" "Sexy and I Know It"
Kelly Clarkson	"Dark Side"
The Wanted	"Chasing the Sun" "Glad You Came"
Chris Brown	"Turn Up the Music"
Natasha Bedingfield^{[A]}	Tribute to Donna Summer "Last Dance"
Usher	"Scream"
Justin Bieber	"Boyfriend"
Carly Rae Jepsen	"Call Me Maybe"
Carrie Underwood	"Blown Away"
Linkin Park	"Burn It Down"
Katy Perry	"Wide Awake"
John Legend; Jordin Sparks	Tribute to Whitney Houston "The Greatest Love of All" (Legend) "I Will Always Love You" (Sparks)
Goodie Mob	Tribute to Beastie Boys "Fight to Win" "(You Gotta) Fight for Your Right (To Party!)"
Patent Pending	"Dance Till We Die"
Nelly Furtado	"Big Hoops (Bigger the Better)"
Stevie Wonder; Alicia Keys	"Higher Ground" "Overjoyed" "Empire State of Mind" "Join Our Love" "Superstition"

Notes
^{A} - Midway through the performance, ABC cut to commercial.

== Presenters ==
- Julianne Hough – presented Top Social Artist
- Lisa Marie Presley – presented the Spotlight Award to Katy Perry
- Robin Thicke – introduced Kelly Clarkson
- Miley Cyrus – presented Top New Artist
- Brandy – introduced Chris Brown
- Natasha Bedingfield – Gave short monologue and tribute to Donna Summer
- Kris Kristofferson – Gave speech to highlight accomplishments of Taylor Swift
- Zooey Deschanel – presented Woman of the Year to Taylor Swift
- Far East Movement – introduced Usher
- Jason Derülo – presented Top Hot 100 Song
- Wiz Khalifa – presented Top Duo/Group
- Luke Bryan – introduced Carrie Underwood
- Gladys Knight – presented Top Male Artist
- Swizz Beatz – introduced Linkin Park
- Monica and Eric Benet – presented Top R&B Artist
- Whoopi Goldberg – introduced the Whitney Houston tribute & presented the Billboard Millenium Award (accepted on behalf of Houston by her daughter Bobbi Kristina Brown and sister in-law Pat Houston)
- Taio Cruz – introduced Patent Pending
- Gavin DeGraw – introduced Nelly Furtado
- Alicia Keys – presented the Icon Award to Stevie Wonder

== Winners and nominees ==
Winners are listed first and in bold.

Top Artist	Top New Artist
**Adele**; Lady Gaga; Lil Wayne; Katy Perry; Rihanna	**Wiz Khalifa**; Bad Meets Evil; Big Sean; Foster the People; Scotty McCreery
Top Male Artist	Top Female Artist
**Lil Wayne**; Justin Bieber; Chris Brown; Drake; Bruno Mars	**Adele**; Lady Gaga; Nicki Minaj; Katy Perry; Rihanna
Top Duo/Group	Top Billboard 200 Artist
**LMFAO**; The Black Eyed Peas; Coldplay; Lady Antebellum; Maroon 5	**Adele**; Justin Bieber; Michael Bublé; Lady Gaga; Lil Wayne
Top Billboard 200 Album	Top Hot 100 Artist
**21 – Adele**; Christmas – Michael Bublé; Take Care – Drake; Born This Way – Lady Gaga; Tha Carter IV – Lil Wayne	**Adele**; LMFAO; Bruno Mars; Katy Perry; Rihanna
Top Hot 100 Song	Top Touring Artist
**"Party Rock Anthem" – LMFAO featuring Lauren Bennett & GoonRock**; "Rolling in the Deep" – Adele; "Moves Like Jagger" – Maroon 5 featuring Christina Aguilera; "E.T." – Katy Perry featuring Kanye West; "Give Me Everything" – Pitbull featuring Ne-Yo, Afrojack & Nayer	**U2**; Bon Jovi; Taylor Swift; Take That; Roger Waters
Top Digital Songs Artist	Top Digital Song
**Adele**; LMFAO; Bruno Mars; Katy Perry; Rihanna	**"Party Rock Anthem" – LMFAO featuring Lauren Bennett & GoonRock**; "Rolling in the Deep" – Adele; "Sexy and I Know It" – LMFAO; "Moves Like Jagger" – Maroon 5 featuring Christina Aguilera; "E.T." – Katy Perry featuring Kanye West
Top Radio Songs Artist	Top Radio Song
**Adele**; Bruno Mars; Nicki Minaj; Katy Perry; Rihanna	**"Give Me Everything" – Pitbull featuring Ne-Yo, Afrojack & Nayer**; "Rolling in the Deep" – Adele; "Party Rock Anthem" – LMFAO featuring Lauren Bennett & GoonRock; "Moves Like Jagger" – Maroon 5 featuring Christina Aguilera; "We Found Love" – Rihanna featuring Calvin Harris
Top Streaming Artist	Top Streaming Song (Audio)
**Rihanna**; Lil Wayne; LMFAO; Nicki Minaj; Bruno Mars	**"Rolling in the Deep" – Adele**; "Without You" – David Guetta featuring Usher; "How To Love" – Lil Wayne; "Party Rock Anthem" – LMFAO featuring Lauren Bennett & GoonRock; "Super Bass" – Nicki Minaj
Top Streaming Song (Video)	Top Digital Media Artist
**"Super Bass" – Nicki Minaj**; "Someone like You" – Adele; "Party Rock Anthem" – LMFAO featuring Lauren Bennett & GoonRock; "Sexy and I Know It" – LMFAO; "The Lazy Song" – Bruno Mars	**Adele**; Justin Bieber; Lady Gaga; Lil Wayne; Rihanna
Top Pop Artist	Top Pop Album
**Adele**; Lady Gaga; LMFAO; Katy Perry; Rihanna	**21 – Adele**; 19 – Adele; Under the Mistletoe – Justin Bieber; Christmas – Michael Bublé; Born This Way – Lady Gaga
Top Pop Song	Top R&B Artist
**"Party Rock Anthem" – LMFAO featuring Lauren Bennett & GoonRock**; "Rolling in the Deep" – Adele; "Sexy and I Know It" – LMFAO; "Moves Like Jagger" – Maroon 5 featuring Christina Aguilera; "E.T." – Katy Perry featuring Kanye West	**Chris Brown**; Beyoncé; Cee Lo Green; Miguel; Rihanna
Top R&B Album	Top R&B Song
**4 – Beyoncé**; My Life II... The Journey Continues (Act 1) – Mary J. Blige; F.A.M.E. – Chris Brown; I Remember Me – Jennifer Hudson; Talk That Talk – Rihanna	**"Motivation" – Kelly Rowland featuring Lil Wayne**; "She Ain't You" – Chris Brown; "Fk You (Forget You)" – Cee Lo Green; "Down on Me" – Jeremih featuring 50 Cent; "Sure Thing" – Miguel
Top Rap Artist	Top Rap Album
**Lil Wayne**; Drake; LMFAO; Nicki Minaj; Wiz Khalifa	**Tha Carter IV – Lil Wayne**; Hell: The Sequel – Bad Meets Evil; Take Care – Drake; Watch The Throne – Jay-Z & Kanye West; Sorry For Party Rocking – LMFAO
Top Rap Song	Top Country Artist
**"Party Rock Anthem" - LMFAO featuring Lauren Bennett & GoonRock**; "Good Feeling'" – Flo Rida; "Sexy and I Know It" – LMFAO; "Super Bass" – Nicki Minaj; "Give Me Everything" – Pitbull featuring Ne-Yo, Afrojack & Nayer	**Lady Antebellum**; Jason Aldean; Zac Brown Band; Blake Shelton; Taylor Swift
Top Country Album	Top Country Song
**My Kinda Party – Jason Aldean**; The Band Perry – The Band Perry; Tailgates & Tanlines – Luke Bryan; Clear as Day – Scotty McCreery; Own the Night – Lady Antebellum	**"Dirt Road Anthem" – Jason Aldean**; "Crazy Girl" – Eli Young Band; "Honey Bee" – Blake Shelton; "Just a Kiss" – Lady Antebellum; "Country Girl (Shake It for Me)" – Luke Bryan
Top Rock Artist	Top Rock Album
**Coldplay**; The Black Keys; Foo Fighters; Foster the People; Mumford & Sons	**Mylo Xyloto – Coldplay**; Wasting Light – Foo Fighters; Torches – Foster the People; Sigh No More – Mumford & Sons; Here and Now – Nickelback
Top Rock Song	Top Latin Artist
**"Pumped Up Kicks" – Foster the People**; "Rolling in the Deep" – Adele; "Someone like You" – Adele; "Paradise" – Coldplay; "Walk" – Foo Fighters	**Shakira**; Maná; Pitbull; Prince Royce; Romeo Santos
Top Latin Album	Top Latin Song
**Formula: Vol. 1 – Romeo Santos**; Dejarte de Amar – Camila; Viva el Príncipe – Cristian Castro; Drama Y Luz – Maná; Prince Royce – Prince Royce	**"Danza Kuduro" – Don Omar & Lucenzo**; "Taboo" – Don Omar; "Bon Bon" – Pitbull; "Corazón Sin Cara" – Prince Royce; "Promise" – Romeo Santos featuring Usher
Top Dance Artist	Top Dance Album
**Lady Gaga**; David Guetta; LMFAO; Rihanna; Britney Spears	**Born This Way – Lady Gaga**; Nothing but the Beat – David Guetta; The Fame – Lady Gaga; Sorry For Party Rocking – LMFAO; Scary Monsters and Nice Sprites – Skrillex
Top Dance Song	Top Alternative Artist
**"Party Rock Anthem" – LMFAO featuring Lauren Bennett & GoonRock**; "In the Dark" – Dev; "Without You" – David Guetta featuring Usher; "Sexy and I Know It" – LMFAO; "Till the World Ends" – Britney Spears	**Coldplay**; The Black Keys; Foo Fighters; Foster the People; Mumford & Sons
Top Alternative Album	Top Alternative Song
**Mylo Xyloto – Coldplay**; Wasting Light – Foo Fighters; Torches – Foster the People; Sigh No More – Mumford & Sons; Here and Now – Nickelback	**"Rolling in the Deep" – Adele**; "Sail" – Awolnation; "Paradise" – Coldplay; "Pumped Up Kicks" – Foster the People; "The Cave" – Mumford & Sons
Top Christian Artist	Top Christian Album
**Casting Crowns**; MercyMe; Chris Tomlin; Laura Story; Skillet	**Come to the Well – Casting Crowns**; Until the Whole World Hears – Casting Crowns; Awake – Skillet; Blessings – Laura Story; WOW Hits 2012 – Various Artists
Top Christian Song	Top Social Artist (fan-voted)
**"Blessings" – Laura Story**; "Glorious Day (Living He Loved Me)" – Casting Crowns; "Hold Me" – Jamie Grace featuring TobyMac; "Stronger" – Mandisa; "Strong Enough" – Matthew West	**Justin Bieber**; Eminem; Lady Gaga; Rihanna; Shakira
Icon Award	Millennium Award
Stevie Wonder	Whitney Houston
Spotlight Award	Woman of the Year
Katy Perry	Taylor Swift

=== Artists with multiple wins and nominations ===
Artists that received multiple nominations
Nominations	Artist
22	LMFAO
20	Adele
13	Rihanna
11	Lady Gaga
10	Lil Wayne
9	Katy Perry
8	Lauren Bennett
8	GoonRock
7	Coldplay
7	Foster the People
7	Nicki Minaj
6	Bruno Mars
5	Justin Bieber
5	Foo Fighters
5	Maroon 5
5	Mumford & Sons
5	Pitbull
4	Christina Aguilera
4	Casting Crowns
4	Chris Brown
4	Drake
4	David Guetta
4	Lady Antebellum
4	Kanye West
3	Afrojack
3	Jason Aldean
3	Michael Bublé
3	Nayer
3	Ne-Yo
3	Prince Royce
3	Romeo Santos
3	Laura Story
3	Usher
2	Bad Meets Evil
2	Beyoncé
2	The Black Keys
2	Luke Bryan
2	Cee Lo Green
2	Wiz Khalifa
2	Scotty McCreery
2	Maná
2	Miguel
2	Don Omar
2	Shakira
2	Blake Shelton
2	Skillet
2	Britney Spears
2	Taylor Swift

Artists that received multiple awards
Wins	Artist
12	Adele
6	LMFAO
5	Lauren Bennett
5	GoonRock
4	Coldplay
4	Lil Wayne
2	Jason Aldean
2	Casting Crowns
2	Lady Gaga
