= Billboard Music Award for Top Collaboration =

Music award

This article lists the winners and nominees for the Billboard Music Award for Top Collaboration. Since the creation of this category, Justin Bieber is the first and only artist to win this award multiple times (2).

== Winners and nominees ==
Winners are listed first and highlighted in bold.

=== 2010s ===
Year	Song	Artist	Ref
2017
2017	**"Closer"**	**The Chainsmokers (feat. Halsey)**	
2017	"Don't Let Me Down"	The Chainsmokers (feat. Daya)	
2017	"One Dance"	Drake (feat. Wizkid & Kyla)	
2017	"Cheap Thrills"	Sia (feat. Sean Paul)	
2017	"Starboy"	The Weeknd (feat. Daft Punk)	
2018
2018	**"Despacito"**	**Luis Fonsi and Daddy Yankee (feat. Justin Bieber)**	
2018	"Havana"	Camila Cabello (feat. Young Thug)	
2018	"Something Just Like This"	The Chainsmokers & Coldplay	
2018	"Unforgettable"	French Montana (feat. Swae Lee)	
2018	"Rockstar"	Post Malone (feat. 21 Savage)	
2019
2019	**"Girls Like You"**	**Maroon 5 (feat. Cardi B)**	
2019	"I Like It"	Cardi B, Bad Bunny & J Balvin	
2019	"Love Lies"	Khalid & Normani	
2019	"Psycho"	Post Malone (feat. Ty Dolla Sign)	
2019	"Happier"	Marshmello and Bastille	

=== 2020s ===
Year	Song	Artist	Ref
2020
2020	**"Señorita”**	**Shawn Mendes & Camila Cabello**	
2020	"No Guidance"	Chris Brown (feat. Drake)	
2020	"Old Town Road"	Lil Nas X (feat. Billy Ray Cyrus)	
2020	"Sunflower"	Post Malone & Swae Lee	
2020	"I Don't Care"	Ed Sheeran & Justin Bieber	
2021
2021	**"I Hope"**	**Gabby Barrett (feat. Charlie Puth)**	
2021	"Mood"	24kGoldn (feat. Iann Dior)	
2021	"Go Crazy"	Chris Brown & Young Thug	
2021	"Rockstar"	DaBaby (feat. Roddy Ricch)	
2021	"Whats Poppin"	Jack Harlow (feat. DaBaby, Tory Lanez & Lil Wayne)	
2022
2022	**"Stay"**	**The Kid Laroi & Justin Bieber**	
2022	"Peaches"	Justin Bieber (feat. Daniel Caesar & Giveon)	
2022	"Kiss Me More"	Doja Cat (feat. SZA)	
2022	"Industry Baby"	Lil Nas X & Jack Harlow	
2022	"Save Your Tears"	The Weeknd & Ariana Grande	
2023
2023	**"Creepin'"**	**Metro Boomin, The Weeknd & 21 Savage**	
2023	"I'm Good (Blue)"	David Guetta & Bebe Rexha	
2023	"Calm Down"	Rema & Selena Gomez	
2023	"Unholy"	Sam Smith & Kim Petras	
2023	"Die for You"	The Weeknd & Ariana Grande	
2024
2024	**"I Had Some Help"**	**Post Malone (feat. Morgan Wallen)**	
2024	"I Remember Everything"	Zach Bryan (feat. Kacey Musgraves)	
2024	"Like That"	Future, Metro Boomin & Kendrick Lamar	
2024	"Fortnight"	Taylor Swift (feat. Post Malone)	
2024	"Cowgirls"	Morgan Wallen (feat. Ernest)	

== Multiple awards and nominations ==
=== Wins ===
2 wins

- Justin Bieber

=== Nominations ===
5 nominations
- Post Malone

4 nominations

- Justin Bieber
- The Weeknd

3 nominations

- The Chainsmokers

2 nominations

- 21 Savage
- Chris Brown
- Camila Cabello
- Cardi B
- DaBaby
- Drake
- Ariana Grande
- Jack Harlow
- Lil Nas X
- Metro Boomin
- Swae Lee
- Morgan Wallen
- Young Thug
