= Billboard Music Award for Top Radio Songs Artist =

Annual American music award

The Billboard Music Award for Top Radio Songs Artist winners and nominees. Taylor Swift, Rihanna and The Weeknd have won the award the greatest number of times.

== Winners and nominees ==
Winners are listed first and highlighted in bold.

=== 2010s ===
| Year | Artist | Ref. |
|---|---|---|
| 2011 | **Rihanna** | |
| 2011 | Drake | |
| 2011 | Bruno Mars | |
| 2011 | Katy Perry | |
| 2011 | Usher | |
| 2012 | **Adele** | |
| 2012 | Rihanna | |
| 2012 | Bruno Mars | |
| 2012 | Nicki Minaj | |
| 2012 | Katy Perry | |
| 2013 | **Rihanna** | |
| 2013 | Flo Rida | |
| 2013 | Fun | |
| 2013 | Maroon 5 | |
| 2013 | Nicki Minaj | |
| 2014 | **Justin Timberlake** | |
| 2014 | Imagine Dragons | |
| 2014 | Lorde | |
| 2014 | Bruno Mars | |
| 2014 | Katy Perry | |
| 2015 | **Sam Smith** | |
| 2015 | John Legend | |
| 2015 | Maroon 5 | |
| 2015 | Ed Sheeran | |
| 2015 | Taylor Swift | |
| 2016 | **The Weeknd** | |
| 2016 | Justin Bieber | |
| 2016 | Ellie Goulding | |
| 2016 | Ed Sheeran | |
| 2016 | Taylor Swift | |
| 2017 | **Twenty One Pilots** | |
| 2017 | The Chainsmokers | |
| 2017 | Drake | |
| 2017 | Justin Bieber | |
| 2017 | Rihanna | |
| 2018 | **Ed Sheeran** | |
| 2018 | Bruno Mars | |
| 2018 | Charlie Puth | |
| 2018 | Halsey | |
| 2018 | Imagine Dragons | |
| 2019 | **Drake** | |
| 2019 | Ariana Grande | |
| 2019 | Cardi B | |
| 2019 | Post Malone | |
| 2019 | Maroon 5 | |

=== 2020s ===
| Year | Artist | Ref. |
|---|---|---|
| 2020 | **Jonas Brothers** | |
| 2020 | Khalid | |
| 2020 | Lizzo | |
| 2020 | Shawn Mendes | |
| 2020 | Post Malone | |
| 2021 | **The Weeknd** | |
| 2021 | Justin Bieber | |
| 2021 | Lewis Capaldi | |
| 2021 | Dua Lipa | |
| 2021 | Harry Styles | |
| 2022 | **Olivia Rodrigo** | |
| 2022 | Doja Cat | |
| 2022 | Ed Sheeran | |
| 2022 | Justin Bieber | |
| 2022 | The Weeknd | |
| 2023 | **Taylor Swift** | |
| 2023 | Miley Cyrus | |
| 2023 | SZA | |
| 2023 | Morgan Wallen | |
| 2023 | The Weeknd | |
| 2024 | **Taylor Swift** | |
| 2024 | Sabrina Carpenter | |
| 2024 | Doja Cat | |
| 2024 | SZA | |
| 2024 | Morgan Wallen | |

== Superlatives ==
Wins

- 2 (Taylor Swift, Rihanna, The Weeknd)

Nominations

- 4 (Justin Bieber, Ed Sheeran, The Weeknd); 3 (Bruno Mars, Katy Perry, Rihanna, Taylor Swift); 2 (Maroon 5, Nicki Minaj)
