= Billboard Music Award for Top Christian Artist =

Annual American music award

The Billboard Music Award winners for Top Christian Artist. Notable recipients include Hillsong United and Chris Tomlin.

== Winners and nominees ==
Winners are listed first and highlighted in bold.

=== 1990s ===
Year	Artist	Ref.
1998	**LeAnn Rimes**	

=== 2010s ===
Year	Artist	Ref.
2011	**Chris Tomlin**	
2011	Casting Crowns	
2011	MercyMe	
2011	Skillet	
2011	TobyMac	
2012	**Casting Crowns**	
2012	Laura Story	
2012	Chris Tomlin	
2012	MercyMe	
2012	Skillet	
2013	**TobyMac**	
2013	Casting Crowns	
2013	MercyMe	
2013	Chris Tomlin	
2013	Matt Redman	
2014	**Chris Tomlin**	
2014	Mandisa	
2014	Skillet	
2014	TobyMac	
2014	Matthew West	
2015	**Hillsong United**	
2015	Casting Crowns	
2015	Lecrae	
2015	MercyMe	
2015	Newsboys	
2016	**Hillsong United**	
2016	Casting Crowns	
2016	Lauren Daigle	
2016	MercyMe	
2016	Chris Tomlin	
2017	**Lauren Daigle**	
2017	Chris Tomlin	
2017	Hillary Scott & the Family	
2017	Hillsong Worship	
2017	Skillet	
2018	**MercyMe**	
2018	Elevation Worship	
2018	Hillsong United	
2018	Hillsong Worship	
2018	Zach Williams	
2019	**Lauren Daigle**	
2019	for KING & COUNTRY	
2019	Hillsong Worship	
2019	MercyMe	
2019	Cory Asbury	

=== 2020s ===
Year	Artist	Ref.
2020	**Lauren Daigle**	
2020	Elevation Worship	
2020	for KING & COUNTRY	
2020	Hillsong Worship	
2020	Kanye West	
2021	**Elevation Worship**	
2021	Casting Crowns	
2021	for KING & COUNTRY	
2021	Carrie Underwood	
2021	Zach Williams	
2022	**Kanye West**	
2022	Carrie Underwood	
2022	Elevation Worship	
2022	Lauren Daigle	
2022	for KING & COUNTRY	
2023	**Lauren Daigle**	
2023	Brandon Lake	
2023	Elevation Worship	
2023	for KING & COUNTRY	
2023	Phil Wickham	
2024	**Elevation Worship**	
2024	Anne Wilson	
2024	Brandon Lake	
2024	Forrest Frank	
2024	Lauren Daigle	

== Multiple wins and nominations ==
=== Wins ===
- 4 (Lauren Daigle)
- 2 (Hillsong United, Chris Tomlin)

=== Nominations ===
- 7 (MercyMe)
- 6 (Casting Crowns, Lauren Daigle)
- 5 (Elevation Worship, KING & COUNTRY, Chris Tomlin)
- 4 (Hillsong United)
- 3 (Skillet)
- 2 (TobyMac, Kanye West)
