= I Had Some Help =

Single by Post Malone featuring Morgan Wallen

from the album F-1 Trillion
- Released: May 10, 2024
- Genre: Country pop; country rock
- Length: 2:58
- Label: Republic; Mercury
- Songwriters: Austin Post; Morgan Wallen; Louis Bell; Ryan Vojtesak; Jonathan Hoskins; Ernest Keith Smith; Ashley Gorley; Chandler Walters
- Producers: Louis Bell; Charlie Handsome; Jonathan Hoskins

Post Malone singles chronology
"Fortnight" (2024)	"I Had Some Help" (2024)	"Pour Me a Drink" (2024)

Morgan Wallen singles chronology
"Cowgirls" (2024)	"I Had Some Help" (2024)	"Whiskey Whiskey" (2024)

Music video
- "I Had Some Help" on YouTube

"I Had Some Help" is a song by American musician Post Malone featuring American country music singer Morgan Wallen. It was released through Republic and Mercury Records as the lead single from Malone's sixth studio album, F-1 Trillion, on May 10, 2024. They wrote the song with producers Louis Bell, Charlie Handsome, and Hoskins, alongside Ernest, Ashley Gorley, and Chandler Paul Walters.

"I Had Some Help" received generally positive reviews from music critics. Commercially, the song debuted atop the Billboard Hot 100 with the highest first week streams since 2020, giving Malone his sixth number one song and Wallen his second. It is the second-longest running number one song of 2024, holding its position for six non consecutive weeks. It made history by debuting at number one on both the Billboard Hot 100 and Billboard's Hot Country Songs chart, and maintaining the top spot on each chart for its first five weeks, a feat that had never been achieved before. The song also debuted at number one on the Billboard's annual Songs of the Summer chart and was subsequently crowned as the 2024 Song of the Summer at the end of the tracking period, having spent 14 weeks at the top. Additionally, it debuted and peaked atop the Billboard Global 200 chart and peaked at number one on the charts in Australia, Canada, Ireland, and Norway.

"I Had Some Help" has topped the US Country Airplay and the all format US Radio Songs charts, making it the sixth song to achieve this milestone and the fastest to do so. It has also topped the US Pop Airplay chart and also became Morgan Wallen's first Adult Pop Airplay number one hit. The song spent 67 weeks on the Hot 100, becoming Post Malone longest charting single on this chart.

== Release and promotion ==
On March 20, 2024, Malone previewed a snippet of the song through social media after a different snippet of a previous version leaked earlier, which had a problem with the mixing. On May 2, 2024, the two artists took to social media to announce the title of the song and its release date.

== Composition ==
The song is written in the key of C major, with a tempo of 128 beats per minute, the main chord progression is F–C–Am–G.

== Music video ==
On May 10, 2024, Malone and Wallen released the official music video, which was filmed in Joshua Tree, California and directed by Chris Villa, with both artists playing leading roles. Also, starring Brandon Michaels as the Bouncer.

== Commercial performance ==
"I Had Some Help" earned 167 first-week adds at country radio, making it only the second song in history to clear the panel in its first week after Garth Brooks in 1997 with "Longneck Bottle". It also broke Spotify's single-day country streaming record with nearly 14 million streams, debuted at No. 1 on the streaming platform's Global Daily chart and became its top male collaboration debut of all time, in addition to topping Apple Music's Global chart and Pandora's Top Thumb Hundred chart, upon release.

In the United States, "I Had Some Help" debuted at number 18 on the Billboard Country Airplay chart dated May 18, 2024, climbing to number nine the following week, before eventually reaching number one for the week June 29, 2024 after spending seven weeks on the chart. It is the first song to reach the top 10 in two weeks or fewer since Brooks' "More Than a Memory" debuted at number one in September 2007, as well as the fewest total cumulative weeks to reach number one since Tim McGraw's "Live Like You Were Dying" reached the top spot in its seventh week in July 2004. In addition, it is Malone's first number one on the Country Airplay chart, as well as Wallen's thirteenth. The song would notch a second week at number one for the week of July 6, 2024 while Wallen's "Cowgirls" featuring Ernest held the number two position on the Country Airplay chart the same week, making Wallen the third artist in the chart's history to hold the top two positions concurrently. It would remain at the top for two additional weeks before being displaced by "Cowgirls" on the chart dated July 27, 2024, making it the first time that an act has achieved back-to-back number one singles since 2002 when McGraw topped the chart back-to-back, first as a featured artist on Jo Dee Messina's "Bring On the Rain" then with his own "The Cowboy in Me", and only the second time that such a distinction has been achieved in the chart's history. The song currently ranks at No. 4 on the Adult Pop Airplay chart.

On the Billboard Hot 100, "I Had Some Help" debuted at number one on the chart dated May 25, 2024, with first-week figures of 76.4 million official streams, 31.1 million radio airplay audience impressions and 69,000 copies sold. It registered the highest first-week streaming figure since Billboard removed YouTube song user-generated content from its chart metrics in year 2020, surpassing Taylor Swift and Post Malone's song "Fortnight". It is Malone's sixth number-one single, fifth as lead artist, and second number-one debut. Post Malone tied the record as the fastest male artist to accumulate two No. 1 debuts on Billboard Hot 100 history, "Fortnight" and "I Had Some Help" within just four weeks, after Drake previously achieved the feat with the first two singles from his "For All the Dogs" album in 2023. "I Had Some Help" is the first song to spend its first five weeks on the Billboard Hot 100 chart at No. 1 since Miley Cyrus' "Flowers", which held the top spot for its first six weeks in January–March 2023. It is also the first song in nearly a year to spend five consecutive weeks at No. 1 on the Billboard Hot 100 chart, since Wallen's "Last Night" spent 10 straight weeks at the top out of 16 total weeks in May–July 2023. Additionally, it is the first song to log six weeks at No. 1 on the Billboard Hot 100 in 2024, surpassing the five weeks on top, of six total dating to late 2023, for Jack Harlow's "Lovin on Me". Furthermore, it is the first song to have debuted atop both the Billboard Hot 100 and Billboard's Hot Country Songs chart and spent its first five weeks on each at No. 1.

On the Billboard Global 200, it debuted at No. 1 with 119 million streams and 81,000 sold worldwide in the week. It is the third Global 200 No. 1 that has topped Billboard's Hot Country Songs chart, after Beyoncé's "Texas Hold 'Em" and Taylor Swift's "All Too Well (Taylor's Version)."

On the US Radio Songs chart, "I Had Some Help" was the fastest song to hit the top five since Miley Cyrus' "Flowers" in 2023. It's also the first song to have reached the top five in as few as four weeks that has also hit the US Country Airplay chart's top five. "I Had Some Help" became the sixth song and the fastest to do so, to top both the US Country Airplay and all-format US Radio Songs charts.

The song debuted at number one on Billboard's Annual Songs of the Summer chart and was subsequently crowned as the 2024 Song of the Summer at the end of the tracking period.

== Usage in media ==
The song was featured in the end credits of the 2024 Sony's Spider-Man Universe film Venom: The Last Dance, used as a parallel for the toxic relationship between Venom and his symbiotic host Eddie Brock (Tom Hardy), even though the pair worked through it and ended up as best friends.

== Accolades ==
Awards and nominations for "I Had Some Help"
Organization	Year	Category	Result	Ref.
Billboard Music Awards	2024	Top Collaboration	Won	
Billboard Music Awards	2024	Top Hot 100 Song	Nominated	
Billboard Music Awards	2024	Top Streaming Song	Nominated	
Billboard Music Awards	2024	Top Selling Song	Nominated	
Billboard Music Awards	2024	Top Country Song	Nominated	
Country Music Association Awards	2024	Single of the Year	Nominated	
Country Music Association Awards	2024	Song of the Year	Nominated	
Country Music Association Awards	2024	Video of the Year	Nominated	
Country Music Association Awards	2024	Musical Event of the Year	Nominated	
MTV Video Music Awards	2024	Best Collaboration	Nominated	
MTV Video Music Awards	2024	Song of Summer	Nominated	
People's Choice Country Awards	2024	Song of the Year	Won	
People's Choice Country Awards	2024	Music Video of the Year	Nominated	
People's Choice Country Awards	2024	Crossover Song of the Year	Nominated	
Grammy Awards	2025	Best Country Duo/Group Performance	Nominated	
Grammy Awards	2025	Best Country Song	Nominated	
iHeartRadio Music Awards	2025	Song of the Year	Nominated	
iHeartRadio Music Awards	2025	Country Song of the Year	Won	
iHeartRadio Music Awards	2025	Best Collaboration	Nominated	
iHeartRadio Music Awards	2025	Best Lyrics	Nominated	
iHeartRadio Music Awards	2025	Best Music Video	Nominated	
Brit Awards	2025	Best International Song	Nominated	
American Music Awards	2025	Song of the Year	Nominated	
American Music Awards	2025	Favorite Country Song	Won	
American Music Awards	2025	Collaboration of the Year	Nominated	
Academy of Country Music Awards	2025	Song of the Year	Nominated	
Academy of Country Music Awards	2025	Single of the Year	Nominated	
Academy of Country Music Awards	2025	Music Event of the Year	Nominated	

== Live performances ==
On April 28, 2024, Malone and Wallen both performed their own sets at the Stagecoach Festival in Indio, California, and Wallen brought Malone out to perform the song with him for the first time ahead of its release. On May 16, 2024, Malone performed the song at 59th Academy of Country Music Awards in Frisco, Texas. On May 28, 2024, Malone performed the song at Louvre Museum in Paris. On June 7, 2024, Malone performed the song at Governor's Ball in New York City.

== Personnel ==
- Post Malone – vocals
- Morgan Wallen – vocals
- Louis Bell – producer, recording engineer, vocal engineer
- Charlie Handsome – producer
- Hoskins – producer, co-producer
- Aaron Sterling – drums
- Craig Young – bass guitar
- Derek Wells – electric guitar
- Bryan Sutton – acoustic guitar
- Dave Cohen – keyboards
- Paul Franklin – pedal steel guitar
- Larry Franklin – fiddle
- Ryan Gore – mixing
- Ted Jensen – mastering

== Charts ==
=== Weekly charts ===
Weekly chart performance for "I Had Some Help"
Chart (2024–2025)	Peak position
Argentina Airplay (Monitor Latino)	3
Australia (ARIA)	1
Australia Country Hot 50 (The Music)	1
Austria (Ö3 Austria Top 40)	17
Belgium (Ultratop 50 Flanders)	13
Belgium (Ultratop 50 Wallonia)	39
Bolivia Airplay (Monitor Latino)	1
Brazil International Airplay (Crowley Charts)	8
Canada Hot 100 (Billboard)	1
Canada AC (Billboard)	2
Canada CHR/Top 40 (Billboard)	1
Canada Country (Billboard)	1
Canada Hot AC (Billboard)	4
CIS Airplay (TopHit)	39
Colombia Anglol Airplay (National-Report)	3
Costa Rica Anglo Airplay (Monitor Latino)	6
Czech Republic Singles Digital (ČNS IFPI)	71
Denmark (Tracklisten)	4
Dominican Republic Anglo Airplay (Monitor Latino)	9
Ecuador Anglo Airplay (Monitor Latino)	5
El Salvador Anglo Airplay (Monitor Latino)	4
Estonia Airplay (TopHit)	13
Finland (Suomen virallinen lista)	32
France (SNEP)	157
Germany (GfK)	35
Global 200 (Billboard)	1
Greece International (IFPI)	51
Guatemala Anglo Airplay (Monitor Latino)	9
Hungary (Editors' Choice Top 40)	32
Iceland (Tónlistinn)	10
Ireland (IRMA)	1
Italy Airplay (EarOne)	8
Japan Hot Overseas (Billboard Japan)	5
Latvia Airplay (LaIPA)	5
Lithuania Airplay (TopHit)	29
Malta Airplay (Radiomonitor)	4
Mexico Anglo Airplay (Monitor Latino)	6
Netherlands (Dutch Top 40)	6
Netherlands (Single Top 100)	15
New Zealand (Recorded Music NZ)	2
Nicaragua Anglo Airplay (Monitor Latino)	3
Nigeria (TurnTable Top 100)	84
Norway (VG-lista)	1
Panama Anglo Airplay (Monitor Latino)	4
Peru Anglo Airplay (Monitor Latino)	10
Portugal (AFP)	37
Puerto Rico Anglo Airplay (Monitor Latino)	3
San Marino Airplay (SMRTV Top 50)	8
Slovakia Airplay (ČNS IFPI)	15
South Africa Airplay (TOSAC)	1
South Africa Streaming (TOSAC)	4
South Korea BGM (Circle)	147
South Korea Download (Circle)	109
Sweden (Sverigetopplistan)	3
Switzerland (Schweizer Hitparade)	19
UK Singles (Official Charts)	2
US Billboard Hot 100	1
US Adult Contemporary (Billboard)	8
US Adult Pop Airplay (Billboard)	1
US Country Airplay (Billboard)	1
US Hot Country Songs (Billboard)	1
US Pop Airplay (Billboard)	1
Venezuela Anglo Airplay (Monitor Latino)	2

=== Monthly charts ===
Monthly chart performance for "I Had Some Help"
Chart (2024)	Peak position
CIS Airplay (TopHit)	39
Estonia Airplay (TopHit)	16
Lithuania Airplay (TopHit)	34

=== Year-end charts ===
2024 year-end chart performance for "I Had Some Help"
Chart (2024)	Position
Australia (ARIA)	7
Belgium (Ultratop 50 Flanders)	39
Canada (Canadian Hot 100)	4
CIS Airplay (TopHit)	116
Denmark (Tracklisten)	33
Estonia Airplay (TopHit)	50
Global 200 (Billboard)	14
Iceland (Tónlistinn)	16
Netherlands (Dutch Top 40)	13
Netherlands (Single Top 100)	39
New Zealand (Recorded Music NZ)	11
Sweden (Sverigetopplistan)	17
Switzerland (Schweizer Hitparade)	55
UK Singles (OCC)	15
US Billboard Hot 100	4
US Adult Contemporary (Billboard)	20
US Adult Top 40 (Billboard)	7
US Country Airplay (Billboard)	2
US Hot Country Songs (Billboard)	2
US Pop Airplay (Billboard)	16

2025 year-end chart performance for "I Had Some Help"
Chart (2025)	Position
Australia (ARIA)	16
Belgium (Ultratop 50 Flanders)	99
Canada (Canadian Hot 100)	7
Canada AC (Billboard)	2
Canada CHR/Top 40 (Billboard)	42
Canada Country (Billboard)	87
Canada Hot AC (Billboard)	22
Global 200 (Billboard)	26
New Zealand (Recorded Music NZ)	26
Sweden (Sverigetopplistan)	86
UK Singles (OCC)	52
US Billboard Hot 100	8
US Adult Contemporary (Billboard)	11
US Adult Pop Airplay (Billboard)	33
US Hot Country Songs (Billboard)	4

== Certifications ==
Certifications for "I Had Some Help"
Region	Certification	Certified units/sales
Australia (ARIA)	9× Platinum	630,000^{‡}
Belgium (BRMA)	Platinum	40,000^{‡}
Brazil (Pro-Música Brasil)	Diamond	160,000^{‡}
Denmark (IFPI Danmark)	Platinum	90,000^{‡}
France (SNEP)	Gold	100,000^{‡}
New Zealand (RMNZ)	5× Platinum	150,000^{‡}
Portugal (AFP)	Gold	5,000^{‡}
United Kingdom (BPI)	2× Platinum	1,200,000^{‡}
United States (RIAA)	5× Platinum	5,000,000^{‡}
^{‡} Sales+streaming figures based on certification alone.
