= Billboard Music Award for Top Country Artist =

Annual American music award

The Billboard Music Award for Top Country Artist recognizes the most successful country artists on the Billboard Charts over the past year. Garth Brooks, Taylor Swift, and Morgan Wallen have won the most awards with three each. Dixie Chicks became the first group to win it in the 1999 Billboard Music Awards.

== Winners and nominees ==
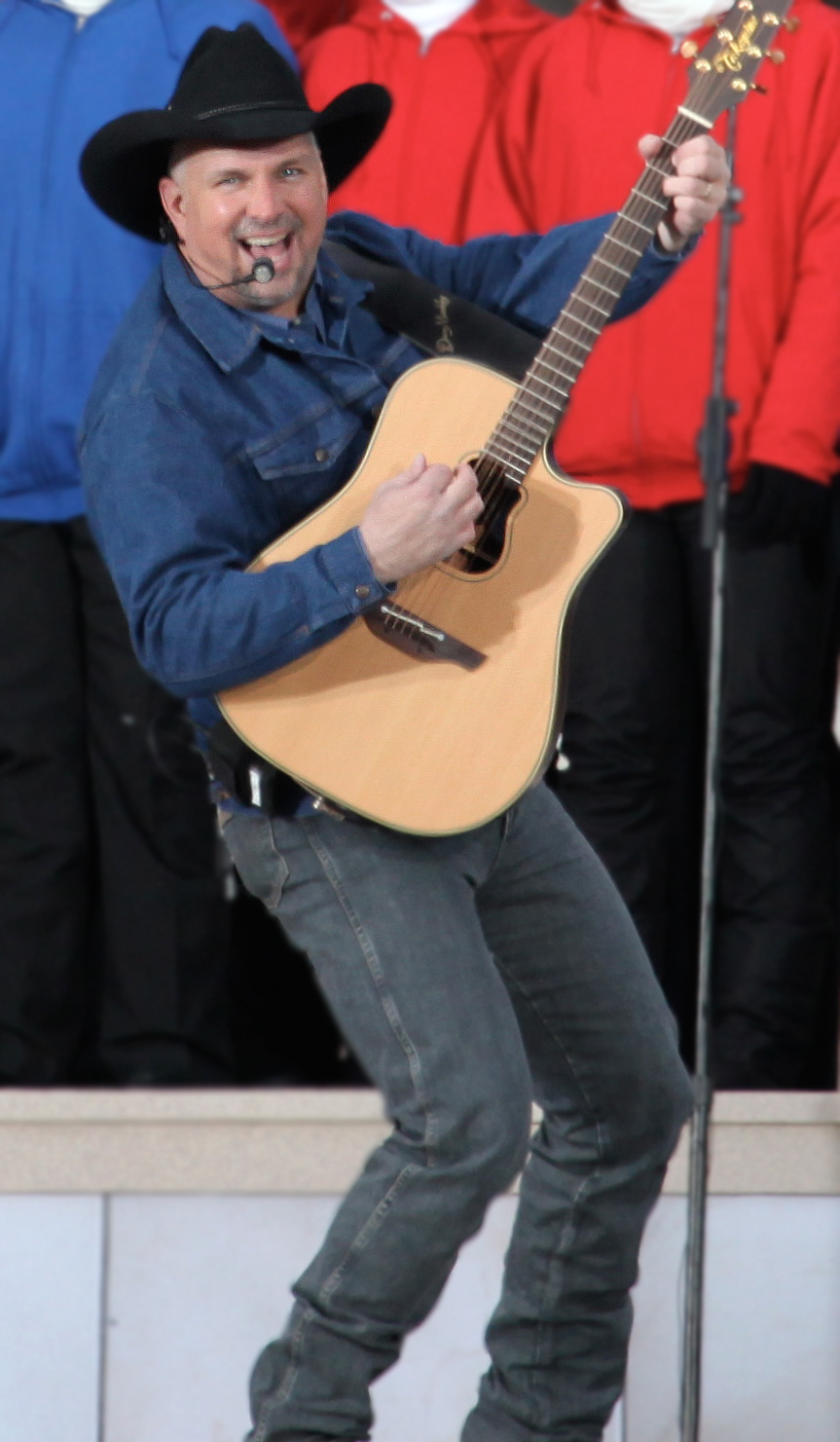
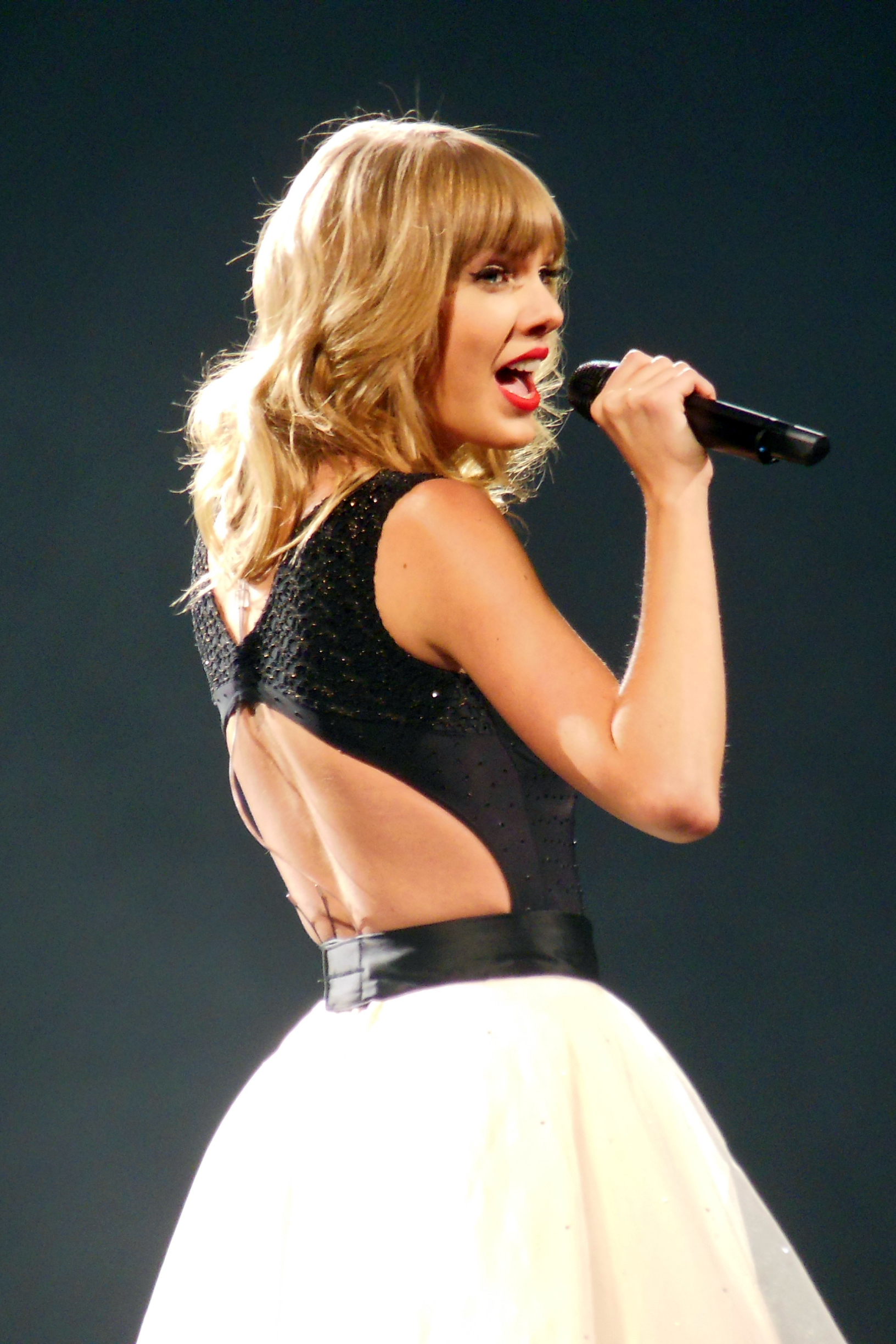
Garth Brooks (left) and Taylor Swift (right) are the most awarded artist in the category.

| Year | Winner | Nominees | Ref. |
|---|---|---|---|
| 1991 | Garth Brooks | | |
| 1993 | Garth Brooks | Billy Ray Cyrus; Reba McEntire; Brooks & Dunn | |
| 1995 | John Michael Montgomery | | |
| 1996 | George Strait | Garth Brooks; Vince Gill; Shania Twain | |
| 1997 | LeAnn Rimes | Alan Jackson; George Strait; Deana Carter | |
| 1998 | Garth Brooks | LeAnn Rimes; George Strait; Tim McGraw | |
| 1999 | Dixie Chicks | Tim McGraw; Martina McBride; George Strait | |
| 2000 | Dixie Chicks | Faith Hill; Tim McGraw; George Strait | |
| 2001 | Tim McGraw | Kenny Chesney; Toby Keith; Travis Tritt | |
| 2003 | Shania Twain | Dixie Chicks; Toby Keith; Tim McGraw | |
| 2005 | Toby Keith | Kenny Chesney; Rascal Flatts; Gretchen Wilson | |
| 2011 | Taylor Swift | Jason Aldean; Kenny Chesney; Lady Antebellum; Zac Brown Band | |
| 2012 | Lady Antebellum | Jason Aldean; Zac Brown Band; Blake Shelton; Taylor Swift | |
| 2013 | Taylor Swift | Jason Aldean; Luke Bryan; Hunter Hayes; Carrie Underwood | |
| 2014 | Luke Bryan | Florida Georgia Line; Darius Rucker; Blake Shelton; Taylor Swift | |
| 2015 | Florida Georgia Line | Jason Aldean; Luke Bryan; Brantley Gilbert; Blake Shelton | |
| 2016 | Luke Bryan | Zac Brown Band; Sam Hunt; Chris Stapleton; Carrie Underwood | |
| 2017 | Blake Shelton | Florida Georgia Line; Keith Urban; Chris Stapleton; Jason Aldean | |
| 2018 | Chris Stapleton | Kane Brown; Luke Combs; Sam Hunt; Thomas Rhett | |
| 2019 | Luke Combs | Kane Brown; Jason Aldean; Florida Georgia Line; Dan + Shay | |
| 2020 | Luke Combs | Kane Brown; Dan + Shay; Maren Morris; Thomas Rhett | |
| 2021 | Morgan Wallen | Gabby Barrett; Kane Brown; Luke Combs; Chris Stapleton | |
| 2022 | Taylor Swift | Luke Combs; Walker Hayes; Chris Stapleton; Morgan Wallen | |
| 2023 | Morgan Wallen | Zach Bryan; Luke Combs; Taylor Swift; Bailey Zimmerman | |
| 2024 | Morgan Wallen | Zach Bryan; Luke Combs; Post Malone; Chris Stapleton | |

== Most wins and nominations ==
The following individuals received two or more Top Country Artist Awards:

| Wins | Artist |
|---|---|
| 3 | Garth Brooks |
| 3 | Taylor Swift |
| 2 | Luke Bryan |
| 2 | Dixie Chicks |
| 2 | Luke Combs |
| 2 | Morgan Wallen |

The following individuals received two or more Top Country Artist nominations:

| Nominations | Artist |
|---|---|
| 5 | Tim McGraw |
| 5 | George Strait |
| 5 | Jason Aldean |
| 5 | Taylor Swift |
| 4 | Garth Brooks |
| 4 | Kane Brown |
| 4 | Luke Bryan |
| 4 | Luke Combs |
| 4 | Blake Shelton |
| 4 | Chris Stapleton |
| 3 | Kenny Chesney |
| 3 | Dixie Chicks |
| 3 | Florida Georgia Line |
| 3 | Toby Keith |
| 3 | Zac Brown Band |
| 2 | Lady Antebellum |
| 2 | LeAnn Rimes |
| 2 | Shania Twain |
| 2 | Carrie Underwood |
| 2 | Morgan Wallen |
