= Billboard Music Award for Top Streaming Songs Artist =

Annual American music award

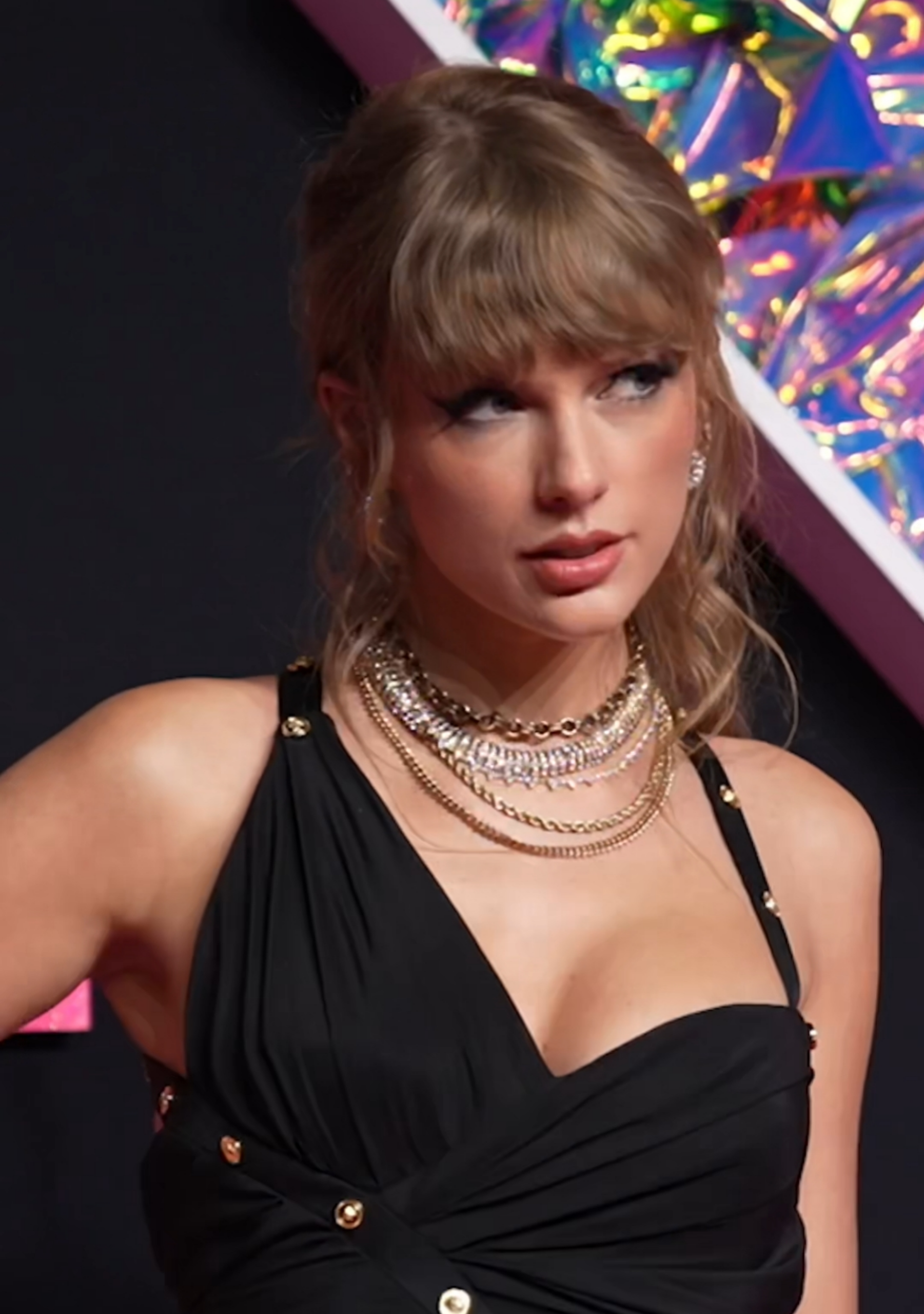
Taylor swift at 2023 MTV Music Award

The Billboard Music Award for Top Streaming Songs Artist winners and nominees.

== Winners and nominees ==
Winners are listed first and highlighted in bold.

=== 2010s ===
Year	Artist	Ref.
2011	**Justin Bieber**	
2011	Eminem	
2011	Lady Gaga	
2011	Rihanna	
2011	Shakira	
2012	**Rihanna**	
2012	LMFAO	
2012	Lil Wayne	
2012	Bruno Mars	
2012	Nicki Minaj	
2013	**Nicki Minaj**	
2013	Baauer	
2013	Drake	
2013	Psy	
2013	Rihanna	
2014	**Miley Cyrus**	
2014	Imagine Dragons	
2014	Macklemore & Ryan Lewis	
2014	Katy Perry	
2014	Psy	
2015	**Iggy Azalea**	
2015	Ariana Grande	
2015	Nicki Minaj	
2015	Taylor Swift	
2015	Meghan Trainor	
2016	**The Weeknd**	
2016	Justin Bieber	
2016	Drake	
2016	Fetty Wap	
2016	Silentó	
2017	**Drake**	
2017	The Chainsmokers	
2017	Desiigner	
2017	Rihanna	
2017	Twenty One Pilots	
2018	**Kendrick Lamar**	
2018	Cardi B	
2018	Drake	
2018	Ed Sheeran	
2018	Post Malone	
2019	**Drake**	
2019	Cardi B	
2019	Ariana Grande	
2019	Post Malone	
2019	XXXTentacion	

=== 2020s ===
Year	Artist	Ref.
2020	**Post Malone**	
2020	DaBaby	
2020	Billie Eilish	
2020	Lil Nas X	
2020	Travis Scott	
2021	**Drake**	
2021	DaBaby	
2021	Lil Baby	
2021	Pop Smoke	
2021	The Weeknd	
2022	**Olivia Rodrigo**	
2022	Doja Cat	
2022	Drake	
2022	Lil Nas X	
2022	The Weeknd	
2023	**Morgan Wallen**	
2023	Zach Bryan	
2023	Drake	
2023	Taylor Swift	
2023	SZA	
2024	**Taylor Swift**	
2024	Zach Bryan	
2024	Sabrina Carpenter	
2024	Kendrick Lamar	
2024	Morgan Wallen	

== Multiple wins and nominations ==
=== Wins ===
- 3 (Drake)

=== Nominations ===
- 8 (Drake)
- 3 (Nicki Minaj, Rihanna, Post Malone, The Weeknd)
- 2 (Justin Bieber, Psy, Ariana Grande, Cardi B, DaBaby, Lil Nas X, Taylor Swift)
