= 2024 Billboard Music Awards =

Annual American music awards ceremony

31st Billboard Music Awards
- Date: December 12, 2024; 8:00 ET/PT
- Country: United States
- Presented by: Marriott Bonvoy
- Hosted by: Michelle Buteau

Highlights
- Most wins: Taylor Swift (10)
- Most nominations: Zach Bryan (18)

Television/radio coverage
- Network: Fox; Paramount+; Fire TV
- Viewership: 1.26 million

The 31st Billboard Music Awards took place on December 12, 2024. Hosted by Michelle Buteau and presented by Marriott Bonvoy, the event was live streamed on Paramount+ and broadcast on Fox and Amazon Fire TV at 8:00 Eastern Time and Pacific Time. Performances were live streamed on Billboard's official website and social media accounts.

== Performers ==
The first line-up of performers were announced on December 2.

Performer(s)	Song(s)	Location	Ref.
Shaboozey	"A Bar Song (Tipsy)"	W Hotel Hollywood	
Teddy Swims	"Bad Dreams"	Los Angeles	
Megan Moroney	"Man on the Moon"	Nashville	
Tyla	"Push 2 Start" "Shake Ah" (featuring Optimist ZA and Ez Maestro)	The Counting House, London	
Jelly Roll	"I Am Not Okay"	Little Caesars Arena, Detroit	
Stray Kids	"Chk Chk Boom" "JJAM"	Los Angeles	
Coldplay	"All My Love"	Accor Stadium, Sydney	
Teddy Swims	"Lose Control"	Los Angeles	
Fuerza Regida	"Pero No Te Enamores" "Nel"	Mayan Theater, Los Angeles	
Seventeen	"Love, Money, Fame"	Los Angeles	
Shaboozey	"Highway"	W Hotel Hollywood	
Jelly Roll	"Liar"	Little Caesars Arena, Detroit	
Linkin Park	"The Emptiness Machine"	Allianz Parque, São Paulo	

== Appearances ==
The Awards featured interviews conducted by host Michelle Buteau and acceptance speeches by Award winners.

Interview appearances

- Flavor Flav
- Zedd
- Bishop Briggs

Award recipients

- Dua Lipa ― Top Dance/Electronic Song
- Tommy Richman ― Top R&B Male Artist and Top R&B Song
- Fuerza Regida ― Top Duo/Group and Top Latin Duo/Group
- Coldplay ― Top Rock Touring Artist
- Teddy Swims ― Top Hot 100 Song and Top Radio Song
- Morgan Wallen ― Top Male Artist, Top Country Artist, Top Country Male Artist and Top Collaboration
- Seventeen ― Top K-Pop Touring Artist
- Shaboozey ― Top Song Sales Artist, Top Selling Song and Top Country Song
- Chappell Roan ― Top New Artist
- FloyyMenor ― Top Latin Song
- Noah Kahan ― Top Rock Album
- Benson Boone ― Top Billboard Global 200 Song and Top Billboard Global (Excl. U.S.) Song
- Tyla ― Top Afrobeats Artist and Top Afrobeats Song
- Stray Kids ― Top Global K-Pop Artist
- Taylor Swift ― Top Artist, Top Female Artist, Top Billboard 200 Artist, Top Hot 100 Artist, Top Hot 100 Songwriter, Top Streaming Songs Artist, Top Radio Songs Artist, Top Billboard Global 200 Artist, Top Billboard Global (Excl. U.S.) Artist and Top Billboard 200 Album
- Linkin Park ― Top Hard Rock Artist and Top Rock Duo/Group

== Winners and nominees ==
Winners are listed first and highlighted in bold.

Top Artist	Top New Artist	Top Male Artist
**Taylor Swift**; Zach Bryan; Sabrina Carpenter; Drake; Morgan Wallen	**Chappell Roan**; Benson Boone; Tommy Richman; Shaboozey; Teddy Swims	**Morgan Wallen**; Zach Bryan; Luke Combs; Drake; Post Malone
Top Female Artist	Top Duo/Group	Top Billboard 200 Artist
**Taylor Swift**; Sabrina Carpenter; Billie Eilish; Chappell Roan; SZA	**Fuerza Regida**; Blink-182; Coldplay; Linkin Park; Stray Kids	**Taylor Swift**; Zach Bryan; Drake; SZA; Morgan Wallen
Top Hot 100 Artist	Top Hot 100 Songwriter	Top Hot 100 Producer
**Taylor Swift**; Zach Bryan; Sabrina Carpenter; Billie Eilish; Morgan Wallen	**Taylor Swift**; Amy Allen; Jack Antonoff; Zach Bryan; Kendrick Lamar	**Jack Antonoff**; Zach Bryan; Daniel Nigro; Finneas O'Connell; Taylor Swift
Top Streaming Songs Artist	Top Radio Songs Artist	Top Song Sales Artist
**Taylor Swift**; Zach Bryan; Sabrina Carpenter; Kendrick Lamar; Morgan Wallen	**Taylor Swift**; Sabrina Carpenter; Doja Cat; SZA; Morgan Wallen	**Shaboozey**; Jelly Roll; Jung Kook; Taylor Swift; Teddy Swims
Top Billboard Global 200 Artist	Top Billboard Global (Excl. U.S.) Artist	Top R&B Artist
**Taylor Swift**; Sabrina Carpenter; Billie Eilish; Ariana Grande; The Weeknd	**Taylor Swift**; Sabrina Carpenter; Billie Eilish; Ariana Grande; The Weeknd	**SZA**; Brent Faiyaz; Tommy Richman; Tyla; The Weeknd
Top R&B Male Artist	Top R&B Female Artist	Top R&B Touring Artist
**Tommy Richman**; Brent Faiyaz; The Weeknd	**SZA**; Muni Long; Tyla	**Bruno Mars**; Chris Brown; Usher
Top Rap Artist	Top Rap Male Artist	Top Rap Female Artist
**Drake**; Future; Kendrick Lamar; Metro Boomin; Travis Scott	**Drake**; Kendrick Lamar; Travis Scott	**Doja Cat**; GloRilla; Nicki Minaj
Top Rap Touring Artist	Top Country Artist	Top Country Male Artist
**Travis Scott**; Nicki Minaj; Suicideboys	**Morgan Wallen**; Zach Bryan; Luke Combs; Post Malone; Chris Stapleton	**Morgan Wallen**; Zach Bryan; Luke Combs
Top Country Female Artist	Top Country Duo/Group	Top Country Touring Artist
**Beyoncé**; Megan Moroney; Lainey Wilson	**The Red Clay Strays**; Zac Brown Band; Treaty Oak Revival	**Zach Bryan**; Kenny Chesney; Luke Combs
Top Rock Artist	Top Hard Rock Artist	Top Rock Duo/Group
**Zach Bryan**; Hozier; Jelly Roll; Noah Kahan; Linkin Park	**Linkin Park**; Bad Omens; Hardy	**Linkin Park**; Good Neighbours; The Red Clay Strays
Top Rock Touring Artist	Top Latin Artist	Top Latin Male Artist
**Coldplay**; The Rolling Stones; Bruce Springsteen & The E Street Band	**Bad Bunny**; Fuerza Regida; Junior H; Karol G; Peso Pluma	**Bad Bunny**; Junior H; Peso Pluma
Top Latin Female Artist	Top Latin Duo/Group	Top Latin Touring Artist
**Karol G**; Shakira; Kali Uchis	**Fuerza Regida**; Eslabon Armado; Grupo Frontera	**Luis Miguel**; Bad Bunny; Karol G
Top Global K-Pop Artist	Top K-Pop Touring Artist	Top Afrobeats Artist
**Stray Kids**; Enhypen; Jimin; Jung Kook; Tomorrow X Together	**Seventeen**; Enhypen; Tomorrow X Together	**Tyla**; Asake; Burna Boy; Rema; Tems
Top Dance/Electronic Artist	Top Christian Artist	Top Gospel Artist
**Charli XCX**; Beyoncé; The Chainsmokers; Dua Lipa; Calvin Harris	**Elevation Worship**; Lauren Daigle; Forrest Frank; Brandon Lake; Anne Wilson	**CeCe Winans**; Kirk Franklin; Maverick City Music; Chandler Moore; Naomi Raine
Top Billboard 200 Album	Top Soundtrack	Top R&B Album
**Taylor Swift – The Tortured Poets Department**; Zach Bryan – Zach Bryan; Drake – For All the Dogs; Noah Kahan – Stick Season; Taylor Swift – 1989 (Taylor's Version)	**Trolls: Band Together**; Hazbin Hotel: Season One; Twisters: The Album; Wish; Wonka	**Chris Brown – 11:11**; Brent Faiyaz – Larger Than Life; PartyNextDoor – PartyNextDoor 4; Bryson Tiller – Bryson Tiller; Tyla – Tyla
Top Rap Album	Top Country Album	Top Rock Album
**Drake – For All the Dogs**; 21 Savage – American Dream; Future & Metro Boomin – We Don't Trust You; Nicki Minaj – Pink Friday 2; Rod Wave – Nostalgia	**Zach Bryan – Zach Bryan**; Beyoncé – Cowboy Carter; Zach Bryan – The Great American Bar Scene; Chris Stapleton – Higher; Bailey Zimmerman – Religiously. The Album.	**Noah Kahan – Stick Season**; Zach Bryan – The Great American Bar Scene; Zach Bryan – Zach Bryan; Hozier – Unheard (EP); Dolly Parton – Rockstar
Top Hard Rock Album	Top Latin Album	Top K-Pop Album
**Sleep Token – Take Me Back to Eden**; Bring Me the Horizon – Post Human: Nex Gen; Falling In Reverse – Popular Monster; Hardy – Quit!!; Pearl Jam – Dark Matter	**Bad Bunny – Nadie Sabie Lo Que Va a Pasar Mañana**; Fuerza Regida – Pa Las Baby's y Belikeada; Grupo Frontera – El Comienzo; Junior H – $ad Boyz 4 Life II; Karol G – Mañana Será Bonito (Bichota Season)	**Jung Kook – Golden**; Ateez – The World EP.Fin: Will; Stray Kids – Rock-Star; Stray Kids – Ate; Tomorrow X Together – The Name Chapter: Freefall
Top Dance/Electronic Album	Top Christian Album	Top Gospel Album
**Charli XCX – Brat**; Jungle – Volcano; Odetari – XIII Sorrows; Troye Sivan – Something to Give Each Other; John Summit – Comfort in Chaos	**Maverick City Music, Chandler Moore & Naomi Raine – The Maverick Way Complete: Complete Vol 02**; Elevation Worship – Can You Imagine?; Forrest Frank – Child of God; Brandon Lake – Coat of Many Colors; Katy Nichole – Jesus Changed My Life	**Maverick City Music, Chandler Moore & Naomi Raine – The Maverick Way Complete: Complete Vol 02**; Kirk Franklin – Father's Day; Koryn Hawthorne – On God; CeCe Winans – More Than This; Naomi Raine – Cover the Earth: Live in New York
Top Hot 100 Song	Top Streaming Song	Top Radio Song
**Teddy Swims – "Lose Control"**; Benson Boone – "Beautiful Things"; Jack Harlow – "Lovin on Me"; Post Malone featuring Morgan Wallen – "I Had Some Help"; Shaboozey – "A Bar Song (Tipsy)"	**Zach Bryan featuring Kacey Musgraves – "I Remember Everything"**; Kendrick Lamar – "Not Like Us"; Post Malone featuring Morgan Wallen – "I Had Some Help"; Shaboozey – "A Bar Song (Tipsy)"; Teddy Swims – "Lose Control"	**Teddy Swims – "Lose Control"**; Benson Boone – "Beautiful Things"; Jack Harlow – "Lovin on Me"; Tate McRae – "Greedy"; Taylor Swift – "Cruel Summer"
Top Selling Song	Top Collaboration	Top Billboard Global 200 Song
**Shaboozey – "A Bar Song (Tipsy)"**; Benson Boone – "Beautiful Things"; Jung Kook – "Standing Next to You"; Post Malone featuring Morgan Wallen – "I Had Some Help"; Teddy Swims – "Lose Control"	**Post Malone featuring Morgan Wallen – "I Had Some Help"**; Zach Bryan featuring Kacey Musgraves – "I Remember Everything"; Future, Metro Boomin & Kendrick Lamar – "Like That"; Taylor Swift featuring Post Malone – "Fortnight"; Morgan Wallen featuring Ernest – "Cowgirls"	**Benson Boone – "Beautiful Things"**; Sabrina Carpenter – "Espresso"; Tate McRae – "Greedy"; Taylor Swift – "Cruel Summer"; Teddy Swims – "Lose Control"
Top Billboard Global (Excl. U.S.) Song	Top R&B Song	Top Rap Song
**Benson Boone – "Beautiful Things"**; Sabrina Carpenter – "Espresso"; Tate McRae – "Greedy"; Taylor Swift – "Cruel Summer"; Teddy Swims – "Lose Control"	**Tommy Richman – "Million Dollar Baby"**; 4Batz featuring Drake – "Act II: Date @ 8 (Remix)"; Muni Long – "Made for Me"; SZA – "Saturn"; Tyla – "Water"	**Kendrick Lamar – "Not Like Us"**; Doja Cat – "Agora Hills"; Doja Cat – "Paint the Town Red"; Future, Metro Boomin & Kendrick Lamar – "Like That"; Jack Harlow – "Lovin on Me"
Top Country Song	Top Rock Song	Top Hard Rock Song
**Shaboozey – "A Bar Song (Tipsy)"**; Zach Bryan featuring Kacey Musgraves – "I Remember Everything"; Dasha – "Austin"; Post Malone featuring Morgan Wallen – "I Had Some Help"; Morgan Wallen – "Thinkin' Bout Me"	**Zach Bryan featuring Kacey Musgraves – "I Remember Everything"**; Zach Bryan – "Pink Skies"; Djo – "End of Beginning"; Hozier – "Too Sweet"; Noah Kahan – "Stick Season"	**Falling In Reverse featuring Jelly Roll – "All My Life"**; Falling In Reverse, Tech N9ne & Alex Terrible – "Ronald"; Hardy – "Psycho"; Linkin Park – "The Emptiness Machine"; Superheaven – "Youngest Daughter"
Top Latin Song	Top Global K-Pop Song	Top Afrobeats Song
**FloyyMenor & Cris MJ – "Gata Only"**; Bad Bunny – "Monaco"; Bad Bunny & Feid – "Perro Negro"; Karol G & Peso Pluma – "Qlona"; Xavi – "La Diabla"	**Jung Kook – "Standing Next to You"**; Illit – "Magnetic"; Jimin – "Who"; Jung Kook featuring Jack Harlow – "3D"; Le Sserafim – "Perfect Night"	**Tyla – "Water"**; Adam Port & Stryv featuring Malachiii – "Move"; Tems – "Me & U"; Tyla – "Truth or Dare"; Tyla, Gunna & Skillibeng – "Jump"
Top Dance/Electronic Song	Top Christian Song	Top Gospel Song
**Dua Lipa – "Houdini"**; Dua Lipa – "Illusion"; Kenya Grace – "Strangers"; Ariana Grande – "Yes, And?"; Marshmello & Kane Brown – "Miles on It"	**Elevation Worship featuring Brandon Lake, Chris Brown & Chandler Moore – "Praise"**; Forrest Frank – "Good Day"; Josiah Queen – "The Prodigal"; Seph Schlueter – "Counting My Blessings"; Tauren Wells, We the Kingdom & Davies – "Take It All Back"	**CeCe Winans – "That's My King"**; Koryn Hawthorne – "Look at God"; Maverick City Music, Chandler Moore & Naomi Raine – "God Problems"; Maverick City Music, Chandler Moore & Naomi Raine featuring Tasha Cobbs Leonard – "In the Room"; Victor Thompson & Gunna featuring Ehis D'Greatest – "This Year (Blessings)"

== Multiple awards and nominations ==
The following received multiple awards:

Ten

- Taylor Swift

Five

- Zach Bryan

Four

- Morgan Wallen

Three

- Bad Bunny
- Chandler Moore
- Drake
- Shaboozey

Two

- Benson Boone
- CeCe Winans
- Charli XCX
- Elevation Worship
- Fuerza Regida
- Jung Kook
- Kacey Musgraves
- Linkin Park
- Maverick City Music
- Naomi Raine
- SZA
- Teddy Swims
- Tommy Richman
- Tyla

The following received multiple nominations:

Eighteen

- Morgan Wallen

Seventeen

- Taylor Swift

Nine

- Sabrina Carpenter

Eight

- Tyla
