= Billboard Music Award for Top Rap Artist =

Annual American rap music award

The Billboard Music Award winners for Top Rap Artist:. Distinguished people that have won the award include Drake, Kanye West, Mase, Winky D, T.I., Lil Wayne, and NLE Choppa. In 2018 the category was split into top Male and Female rap artists.

== Winners and nominees ==
Winners are listed first and highlighted in bold.

=== 1990s ===
Year	Artist	Ref.
1995	**The Notorious B.I.G.**	
1997	**Sean Combs**	
1997	Ma$e	
1997	The Notorious B.I.G.	
1997	MC Lyte	
1998	Ma$e	
1998	Busta Rhymes	
1998	Wyclef Jean	
1998	Sean Combs	
1999	**Jay-Z**	
1999	Busta Rhymes	
1999	JT Money	
1999	Solé	

=== 2000s ===
Year	Artist	Ref.
2001	**Lil Romeo**	
2001	City High	
2001	Bow Wow	
2001	Outkast	
2002	**Nelly**	
2002	Fat Joe	
2002	Ludacris	
2002	Ja Rule	
2003	**50 Cent**	
2003	Chingy	
2003	Fabolous	
2003	Sean Paul	
2004	**Kanye West**	
2004	Jay Z	
2004	Ludacris	
2004	Twista	
2005	**50 Cent**	
2005	Ludacris	
2005	T.I.	
2005	The Game	
2006	**T.I.**	
2006	Dem Franchize Boyz	
2006	Sean Paul	
2006	Yung Joc	

=== 2010s ===
Year	Artist	Ref.
2011	**Eminem**	
2011	Drake	
2011	Lil Wayne	
2011	Ludacris	
2011	Nicki Minaj	
2012	**Lil Wayne**	
2012	Wiz Khalifa	
2012	Nicki Minaj	
2012	Drake	
2012	LMFAO	
2013	**Nicki Minaj**	
2013	Drake	
2013	Flo Rida	
2013	Pitbull	
2013	Psy	
2014	**Eminem**	
2014	Drake	
2014	Jay Z	
2014	Macklemore & Ryan Lewis	
2014	Pitbull	
2015	**Iggy Azalea**	
2015	J. Cole	
2015	Drake	
2015	Rae Sremmurd	
2015	Nicki Minaj	
2016	**Drake**	
2016	Fetty Wap	
2016	Future	
2016	Wiz Khalifa	
2016	Silentó	
2017	**Drake**	
2017	Desiigner	
2017	Future	
2017	J. Cole	
2017	Rae Sremmurd	
2018	**Kendrick Lamar**	
2018	Drake	
2018	Lil Uzi Vert	
2018	Migos	
2018	Post Malone	
2019	**Drake**	
2019	Cardi B	
2019	Juice Wrld	
2019	Post Malone	
2019	Travis Scott	

=== 2020s ===
Year	Artist	Ref.
2020	**Post Malone**	
2020	DaBaby	
2020	Juice Wrld	
2020	Lil Nas X	
2020	Roddy Ricch	
2021	**Pop Smoke**	
2021	DaBaby	
2021	Drake	
2021	Juice Wrld	
2021	Lil Baby	
2022	**Drake**	
2022	Juice Wrld	
2022	Lil Baby	
2022	Moneybagg Yo	
2022	Polo G	
2023	**Drake**	
2023	21 Savage	
2023	Lil Baby	
2023	Metro Boomin	
2023	Travis Scott	
2024	**Drake**	
2024	Future	
2024	Kendrick Lamar	
2024	Metro Boomin	
2024	Travis Scott	

== Multiple wins and nominations ==
The following individuals received three or more Top Rap Artist Awards:

Wins	Artist
7	Drake

The following individuals received two or more Top Rap Artist nominations: 50 Cent and Eminem won all their nominations.

Nominations	Artist
11	Drake
4	Ludacris
4	Nicki Minaj
4	Juice Wrld
3	Post Malone
2	50 Cent
2	Sean Combs
2	DaBaby
2	Eminem
2	Jay Z
2	Lil Baby
2	Lil Wayne
2	Wiz Khalifa
2	Mase
2	Sean Paul
2	Busta Rhymes
2	Pitbull
2	T.I.
