= Billboard Music Award for Top Radio Song =

Annual American music award

The Billboard Music Award for Top Radio Song winners and nominees. As of 2016, no artist has won the award multiple times.

== Winners and nominees ==
Year	Song	Artist	Other nominees
2011	"Just the Way You Are"	Bruno Mars	"Dynamite" – Taio Cruz; "Love the Way You Lie" – Eminem featuring Rihanna; "DJ Got Us Fallin' in Love" – Usher featuring Pitbull; "OMG" – Usher featuring will.i.am
2012	"Give Me Everything"	Pitbull, Ne-Yo, Afrojack, and Nayer	"Moves like Jagger" – Maroon 5 featuring Christina Aguilera; "Party Rock Anthem" – LMFAO featuring Lauren Bennett and GoonRock; "Rolling in the Deep" – Adele; "We Found Love" – Calvin Harris featuring Rihanna
2013	"Somebody That I Used to Know"	Gotye and Kimbra	"Call Me Maybe" – Carly Rae Jepsen; "Locked Out Of Heaven" – Bruno Mars; "One More Night" – Maroon 5; "Payphone" – Maroon 5 featuring Wiz Khalifa
2014	"Blurred Lines"	Robin Thicke, T.I., and Pharrell Williams	"Roar" – Katy Perry; "Royals" – Lorde; "Mirrors" – Justin Timberlake; "Wake Me Up" – Avicii
2015	"All of Me"	John Legend	"Am I Wrong" – Nico & Vinz; "Happy" – Pharrell Williams; "Rude" – MAGIC!; "Stay with Me" – Sam Smith
2016	"Shut Up and Dance"	Walk the Moon	"Can't Feel My Face" – The Weeknd; "Hello" – Adele; "See You Again" – Wiz Khalifa featuring Charlie Puth; "Uptown Funk" – Mark Ronson featuring Bruno Mars
2017	"Can't Stop the Feeling!"	Justin Timberlake	"Cheap Thrills" – Sia featuring Sean Paul; "Closer" – The Chainsmokers featuring Halsey; "Don't Let Me Down" – The Chainsmokers featuring Daya; "One Dance" – Drake featuring Wizkid and Kyla
2018	"Shape of You"	Ed Sheeran	"Attention" – Charlie Puth; "Believer" – Imagine Dragons; "Something Just like This" – The Chainsmokers and Coldplay; "That's What I Like" – Bruno Mars
2019	"Girls Like You"	Maroon 5 featuring Cardi B	"Love Lies" – Khalid & Normani; "Better Now" – Post Malone; "Meant to Be" – Bebe Rexha & Florida Georgia Line; "The Middle" – Zedd, Maren Morris & Grey
2020	"Sucker"	Jonas Brothers	"Someone You Loved" – Lewis Capaldi; "Talk" – Khalid; "Truth Hurts" – Lizzo; "I Don't Care" – Ed Sheeran & Justin Bieber
2021	"Blinding Lights"	The Weeknd	"I Hope" – Gabby Barrett featuring Charlie Puth; "Go Crazy" – Chris Brown & Young Thug; "Don't Start Now" – Dua Lipa; "Adore You" – Harry Styles
2022	"Levitating"	Dua Lipa	"Stay" – The Kid Laroi & Justin Bieber; "Good 4 U" – Olivia Rodrigo; "Bad Habits" – Ed Sheeran; "Save Your Tears" – The Weeknd & Ariana Grande
2023	"Flowers"	Miley Cyrus	"Creepin'" – Metro Boomin, The Weeknd & 21 Savage; "Calm Down" – Rema & Selena Gomez; "Anti-Hero" – Taylor Swift; "Die for You" – The Weeknd & Ariana Grande
2024	"Lose Control"	Teddy Swims	"Beautiful Things" – Benson Boone; "Lovin on Me" – Jack Harlow; "Greedy" – Tate McRae; "Cruel Summer" – Taylor Swift

== Superlatives ==
Nominations

- 4: Bruno Mars, Maroon 5, The Weeknd
- 3: Charlie Puth, Ed Sheeran
- 2: Adele, Pharrell Williams, Wiz Khalifa, Justin Timberlake, The Chainsmokers, Rihanna, Khalid, Justin Bieber, Dua Lipa, Ariana Grande, Taylor Swift
