= 2014 Billboard Music Awards =

Annual American music awards ceremony

- Date: May 18, 2014
- Location: MGM Grand Garden Arena, Las Vegas, Nevada, U.S.
- Hosted by: Ludacris

Highlights
- Most wins: Justin Timberlake (7)
- Most nominations: Imagine Dragons (14)

Television/radio coverage
- Network: ABC

The 2014 Billboard Music Awards ceremony was held on May 18, 2014, at the MGM Grand Garden Arena in Las Vegas, Nevada. It aired live on ABC at 8:00/7:00 PM Central. The show was hosted by Ludacris.

Justin Timberlake won 7 out of his 11 nominations, including Top Artist, Top Male Artist and top Billboard 200 Artist for The 20/20 Experience. Other winners included Imagine Dragons who won five of their 12 nominations and Robin Thicke, Pharrell Williams and T.I. scoring four trophies each. Lorde had 12 nominations. Katy Perry had 10 nominations, including top artist, top female and Hot 100 artist. Miley Cyrus received nine nominations, including top artist, top female, Hot 100 artist and top streaming artist. Macklemore & Ryan Lewis had eight nominations, including top duo/group. At the ceremony, Jennifer Lopez received the Icon Award.

The 2014 Billboard Music Awards had performances by Shakira, One Republic, John Legend, Lorde, Jason Derulo, Carrie Underwood, Miley Cyrus, among others. It was produced by Dick Clark Productions. Allen Shapiro and Mike Mahan were executive producers, with Barry Adelman, Mark Bracco, and Larry Klein as producers.

== Performances ==
=== Pre-show ===
Artist(s)	Song(s)
Austin Mahone	"Mmm Yeah"
Cher Lloyd	"Sirens"

=== Main show ===
Artist(s)	Song(s)
Pitbull; Jennifer Lopez; Claudia Leitte	"We Are One (Ole Ola)"
OneRepublic	"Counting Stars"
Iggy Azalea; Charli XCX; Ariana Grande	"Fancy" (Azalea & XCX) "Problem" (Grande & Azalea)
Florida Georgia Line; Luke Bryan	"This Is How We Roll"
Shakira	"Empire"
5 Seconds of Summer	"She Looks So Perfect"
Katy Perry	"Birthday" (pre-recorded in Newcastle-upon-Tyne, England on May 10 at the Metro Radio Arena during the Prismatic World Tour)
Imagine Dragons	"Tiptoe"
Michael Jackson	"Slave to the Rhythm" (using Pepper's ghost illusion)
Ricky Martin	"Vida"
Luke Bryan	"Play It Again"
Lorde	"Tennis Court"
Miranda Lambert; Carrie Underwood	"Somethin' Bad"
John Legend	"All of Me" "You and I (Nobody in the World)"
Jason Derulo; Snoop Dogg; 2 Chainz	"Wiggle" "Talk Dirty"
Miley Cyrus; The Flaming Lips	"Lucy in the Sky with Diamonds" (pre-recorded May 14 at the Phones4U Arena in Manchester, England during the Bangerz Tour)
Robin Thicke	"Get Her Back"
Jennifer Lopez	"First Love"

=== Resident DJ ===
- Tiesto

== Presenters ==
- Shania Twain presented Top Rock Album
- Danica McKellar & Andi Dorfman introduced OneRepublic
- Kevin O’Leary & Mark Cuban introduced Florida Georgia Line & Luke Bryan
- Miranda Lambert introduced Shakira
- Lucy Hale & Jack Antonoff presented Top Billboard 200 Album
- Kendall Jenner introduced 5 Seconds of Summer
- Carrie Underwood presented Top New Artist
- Criss Angel introduced Imagine Dragons
- Phillip Phillips presented Top Country Artist
- Ludacris, Kesha & Brad Paisley introduced Michael Jackson
- Lindsey Sterling & Sarah Hyland presented Top Rock Song
- Josh Groban presented Top Female Artist
- Wiz Khalifa presented Top R&B Song
- Nicki Minaj introduced Lorde
- Brad Paisley introduced Carrie Underwood & Miranda Lambert
- Austin Mahone & Cher Lloyd presented Top Streaming Artist
- Chrissy Teigen introduced John Legend
- Pete Wentz presented Top Country Song
- Jordin Sparks introduced Jason Derulo, Snoop Dogg & 2 Chainz
- Snoop Dogg introduced Miley Cyrus
- Kelly Rowland presented the Billboard Milestone Award
- Ludacris presented Top Artist
- Iggy Azalea & Ricky Martin introduced & presented the Icon Award to Jennifer Lopez

== Winners and nominees ==
Winners are listed first and in bold.

Top Artist	Top New Artist
**Justin Timberlake**; Miley Cyrus; Imagine Dragons; Bruno Mars; Katy Perry	**Lorde**; Bastille; Capital Cities; Ariana Grande; Passenger
Top Male Artist	Top Female Artist
**Justin Timberlake**; Luke Bryan; Drake; Eminem; Bruno Mars	**Katy Perry**; Beyoncé; Miley Cyrus; Lorde; Rihanna
Top Duo/Group	Top Touring Artist
**Imagine Dragons**; Florida Georgia Line; Macklemore & Ryan Lewis; One Direction; OneRepublic	**Bon Jovi**; Beyoncé; Pink; Rihanna; Bruce Springsteen & the E-Street Band
Top Billboard 200 Artist	Top Billboard 200 Album
**Justin Timberlake**; Beyoncé; Luke Bryan; Eminem; One Direction	**The 20/20 Experience – Justin Timberlake**; Beyoncé – Beyoncé; Crash My Party – Luke Bryan; Nothing Was the Same – Drake; The Marshall Mathers LP 2 – Eminem
Top Hot 100 Artist	Top Hot 100 Song
**Imagine Dragons**; Miley Cyrus; Lorde; Katy Perry; Justin Timberlake	**"Blurred Lines" – Robin Thicke feat. T.I. & Pharrell Williams**; "Wrecking Ball" – Miley Cyrus; "Radioactive" – Imagine Dragons; "Royals" – Lorde; "Roar" – Katy Perry
Top Radio Songs Artist	Top Radio Song
**Justin Timberlake**; Imagine Dragons; Lorde; Bruno Mars; Katy Perry	**"Blurred Lines" – Robin Thicke feat. T.I. & Pharrell Williams**; "Wake Me Up!" – Avicii; "Royals" – Lorde; "Roar" – Katy Perry; "Mirrors" – Justin Timberlake
Top Digital Songs Artist	Top Digital Song
**Katy Perry**; Miley Cyrus; Imagine Dragons; Lorde; Macklemore & Ryan Lewis	**"Blurred Lines" – Robin Thicke feat. T.I. & Pharrell Williams**; "Radioactive" – Imagine Dragons; "Royals" – Lorde; "Counting Stars" – OneRepublic; "Roar" – Katy Perry
Top Social Artist (fan-voted)	Top Streaming Artist
**Justin Bieber**; Miley Cyrus; One Direction; Rihanna; Taylor Swift	**Miley Cyrus**; Imagine Dragons; Macklemore & Ryan Lewis; Katy Perry; PSY
Top Streaming Song (Audio)	Top Streaming Song (Video)
**"Radioactive" – Imagine Dragons**; "Get Lucky" – Daft Punk feat. Pharrell Williams; "Royals" – Lorde; "Can't Hold Us" – Macklemore & Ryan Lewis feat. Ray Dalton; "Blurred Lines" – Robin Thicke feat. T.I. & Pharrell Williams	**"Wrecking Ball" – Miley Cyrus**; "Harlem Shake" – Baauer; "We Can't Stop" – Miley Cyrus; "Thrift Shop" – Macklemore & Ryan Lewis feat. Wanz; "Roar" – Katy Perry
Top Christian Artist	Top Christian Song
**Chris Tomlin**; Mandisa; Skillet; tobyMac; Matthew West	**"Hello, My Name Is" – Matthew West**; "We Won't Be Shaken" – Building 429; "Overcomer" – Mandisa; "Help Me Find It" – Sidewalk Prophets; "Whom Shall I Fear (God of Angel Armies)" – Chris Tomlin
Top Christian Album	Top Country Artist
**Precious Memories Volume II – Alan Jackson**; Rise – Skillet; Miracle – Third Day; Burning Lights – Chris Tomlin; WOW Hits 2014 – Various Artists	**Luke Bryan**; Florida Georgia Line; Darius Rucker; Blake Shelton; Taylor Swift
Top Country Song	Top Country Album
**"Cruise" – Florida Georgia Line feat. Nelly**; "Crash My Party" – Luke Bryan; "That's My Kind of Night" – Luke Bryan; "Wagon Wheel" – Darius Rucker; "Boys 'Round Here" – Blake Shelton feat. Pistol Annies & friends	**Crash My Party – Luke Bryan**; Blame It All on My Roots: Five Decades of Influences – Garth Brooks; Here's to the Good Times – Florida Georgia Line; Duck the Halls: A Robertson Family Christmas – The Robertsons; Based on a True Story... – Blake Shelton
Top Dance/Electronic Artist	Top Dance/Electronic Song
**Daft Punk**; Avicii; Calvin Harris; Lady Gaga; Zedd	**"Wake Me Up!" – Avicii**; "Get Lucky" – Daft Punk ft. Pharrell Williams; "I Love It" – Icona Pop ft. Charli XCX; "Applause" – Lady Gaga; "Clarity" – Zedd ft. Foxes
Top Dance/Electronic Album	Top Latin Artist
**Random Access Memories – Daft Punk**; True – Avicii; Artpop – Lady Gaga; Lindsey Stirling – Lindsey Stirling; Clarity – Zedd	**Marc Anthony**; Gerardo Ortiz; Jenni Rivera; Prince Royce; Romeo Santos
Top Latin Song	Top Latin Album
**"Vivir Mi Vida" – Marc Anthony**; "Limbo" – Daddy Yankee; "Loco" – Enrique Iglesias ft. Romeo Santos; "Darte un Beso" – Prince Royce; "Propuesta Indecente" – Romeo Santos	**3.0 – Marc Anthony**; Confidencias – Alejandro Fernández; 1969 - Siempre, En Vivo Desde Monterrey, Parte 1 – Jenni Rivera; Soy el Mismo – Prince Royce; Formula, Vol. 2 – Romeo Santos
Top R&B Artist	Top R&B Song
**Justin Timberlake**; Beyoncé; Pharrell Williams; Rihanna; Robin Thicke	**"Blurred Lines" – Robin Thicke feat. T.I. & Pharrell Williams**; "Drunk in Love" – Beyoncé ft. Jay-Z; "Hold On, We're Going Home" – Drake ft. Majid Jordan; "Happy" – Pharrell Williams; "Suit & Tie" – Justin Timberlake ft. Jay-Z
Top R&B Album	Top Rap Artist
**The 20/20 Experience – Justin Timberlake**; Beyoncé – Beyoncé; Black Panties – R. Kelly; Blurred Lines – Robin Thicke; The 20/20 Experience – 2 of 2 – Justin Timberlake	**Eminem**; Drake; Jay-Z; Macklemore & Ryan Lewis; Pitbull
Top Rap Song	Top Rap Album
**"Can't Hold Us" – Macklemore & Ryan Lewis feat. Ray Dalton**; "The Monster" – Eminem ft. Rihanna; "Holy Grail" – Jay-Z ft. Justin Timberlake; "Thrift Shop" – Macklemore & Ryan Lewis ft. Wanz; "Timber" – Pitbull ft. Kesha	**The Marshall Mathers LP 2 – Eminem**; Born Sinner – J. Cole; Nothing Was the Same – Drake; Magna Carta Holy Grail – Jay-Z; The Heist – Macklemore & Ryan Lewis
Top Rock Artist	Top Rock Song
**Imagine Dragons**; Capital Cities; Fall Out Boy; Lorde; Passenger	**"Royals" – Lorde**; "Safe and Sound" – Capital Cities; "Demons" – Imagine Dragons; "Radioactive" – Imagine Dragons; "Let Her Go" – Passenger
Top Rock Album	Milestone Award (fan-voted)
**Night Visions – Imagine Dragons**; Born to Die – Lana Del Rey; Save Rock and Roll – Fall Out Boy; Pure Heroine – Lorde; Babel – Mumford & Sons	**Carrie Underwood**; Ellie Goulding (runner-up); OneRepublic (runner-up); Imagine Dragons; John Legend; Luke Bryan
Icon Award
Jennifer Lopez

=== Artists with multiple wins and nominations ===
Artists that received multiple nominations
Nominations	Artist
14	Imagine Dragons
12	Justin Timberlake
12	Lorde
10	Katy Perry
9	Miley Cyrus
9	Pharrell Williams
8	Luke Bryan
8	Macklemore & Ryan Lewis
7	Beyoncé
7	Robin Thicke
6	Eminem
5	Drake
5	Jay-Z
5	Rihanna
5	T.I.
4	Avicii
4	Daft Punk
4	Florida Georgia Line
4	Romeo Santos
3	Marc Anthony
3	Capital Cities
3	Lady Gaga
3	Bruno Mars
3	One Direction
3	OneRepublic
3	Passenger
3	Prince Royce
3	Blake Shelton
3	Chris Tomlin
3	Zedd
2	Ray Dalton
2	Fall Out Boy
2	Mandisa
2	Pitbull
2	Jenni Rivera
2	Darius Rucker
2	Skillet
2	Taylor Swift
2	Wanz
2	Matthew West

Artists that received multiple awards
Wins	Artist
7	Justin Timberlake
5	Imagine Dragons
4	T.I.
4	Robin Thicke
4	Pharrell Williams
3	Marc Anthony
3	Miley Cyrus
2	Luke Bryan
2	Daft Punk
2	Eminem
2	Lorde
2	Katy Perry
