= 2013 Billboard Music Awards =

Annual American music awards ceremony

- Date: May 19, 2013
- Location: MGM Grand Garden Arena, Paradise, Nevada, U.S.
- Hosted by: Tracy Morgan

Highlights
- Most awards: Taylor Swift (8)
- Most nominations: Maroon 5 (14)

Television/radio coverage
- Network: ABC

The 2013 Billboard Music Awards ceremony was held on May 19, 2013, at the MGM Grand Garden Arena in Las Vegas, Nevada. It was aired on ABC at 8:00/7:00 PM central. The show was hosted by Tracy Morgan.

== Performances ==
Performer(s)	Song(s)	Digital sales reaction
Bruno Mars	"Treasure"	24,000 (+220%)
Selena Gomez	"Come & Get It"	171,000 (+4%)
The Band Perry	"Better Dig Two"	
Icona Pop	"I Love It"	134,000 (+4%)
Chris Brown	"Fine China"	35,000 (+41%)
Macklemore; Ryan Lewis; Wanz	"Thrift Shop"	
Taylor Swift; Jabbawockeez	"22"	
Kacey Musgraves	"Merry Go 'Round"	
David Guetta; Chris Brown; Lil Wayne	"I Can Only Imagine"	
Justin Bieber	"Take You"	81,000 (+3%)
Pitbull; Christina Aguilera; Morten Harket (a-ha)	"Feel This Moment" "Take On Me"	3,000 (+30%)
Miguel	"Adorn"	56,000 (+134%)
Ed Sheeran	"Lego House"	
Jennifer Lopez; Pitbull	"Live It Up"	65,000 (+53%)
will.i.am Justin Bieber	"#thatPOWER"	
David Guetta; Akon; Ne-Yo	"Play Hard"	48,000 (+313%)
Nicki Minaj; Lil Wayne	"High School"	
Prince	"Let's Go Crazy" "FixUrLifeUp"	

== Presenters ==
- Shania Twain — Presented "Top Rap Artist"
- Jennifer Nettles – Introduced The Band Perry
- Carly Rae Jepsen — Introduced Icona Pop
- PSY — Introduced Chris Brown
- Alyssa Milano and Avril Lavigne — Presented "Top Digital Song"
- Hayden Panettiere — Introduced Macklemore and Ryan Lewis
- Kid Rock — Presented "Top Rap Song"
- Selena Gomez — Introduced Taylor Swift
- Florida Georgia Line — Introduced Kacey Musgraves
- will.i.am — Presented "Top Touring Artist"
- Ariana Grande — Introduced Justin Bieber
- Emmy Rossum and Jason Derulo — Presented "Top Billboard 200 Album"
- Ke$ha — Introduced Pitbull and Christina Aguilera
- Miley Cyrus — Presented "Top Male Artist"
- Jennifer Morrison — Introduced Miguel
- Chloë Grace Moretz — Introduced Ed Sheeran
- Gabriel Mann and Stana Katic — Introduced Jennifer Lopez and Pitbull
- Kelly Rowland and Austin Mahone — Presented "EDM – Electronic Dance Music"
- Wiz Khalifa and SkyBlu — Introduced will.i.am and Justin Bieber
- Brett Eldredge and Emblem3 — Presented "Top Country Group"
- Jenny McCarthy – Introduced David Guetta, Akon and Ne-Yo
- Cee Lo Green — Presented "Milestone Award"
- Celine Dion — Presented "Artist of the Year"
- Erykah Badu and Janelle Monáe – Presented "Icon Award"

== Winners and nominees ==
Winners are listed first and in bold.

Top Artist	Top New Artist
**Taylor Swift**; Justin Bieber; Maroon 5; One Direction; Rihanna	**One Direction**; Carly Rae Jepsen; Gotye; PSY; The Lumineers
Top Male Artist	Top Female Artist
**Justin Bieber**; Bruno Mars; Drake; Flo Rida; Jason Aldean	**Taylor Swift**; Adele; Carly Rae Jepsen; Nicki Minaj; Rihanna
Top Duo/Group	Top Billboard 200 Artist
**One Direction**; Coldplay; fun.; Maroon 5; Mumford & Sons	**Taylor Swift**; Adele; Justin Bieber; Mumford & Sons; One Direction
Top Billboard 200 Album	Top Hot 100 Artist
**Red – Taylor Swift**; 21 – Adele; Babel – Mumford & Sons; Take Me Home – One Direction; Up All Night – One Direction	**Maroon 5**; Flo Rida; fun.; Rihanna; Taylor Swift
Top Hot 100 Song	Top Touring Artist
"**Somebody That I Used to Know" - Gotye featuring Kimbra**; "Some Nights" – fun.; "Call Me Maybe" – Carly Rae Jepsen; "One More Night" – Maroon 5; "Payphone" – Maroon 5 featuring Wiz Khalifa	**Madonna**; Bruce Springsteen; Coldplay; Lady Gaga; Roger Waters
Top Digital Songs Artist	Top Digital Song
**Taylor Swift**; Carly Rae Jepsen; Flo Rida; fun.; Maroon 5	"**Call Me Maybe"- Carly Rae Jepsen**; "We Are Young" – fun. featuring Janelle Monáe; "Somebody That I Used to Know" – Gotye featuring Kimbra; "Thrift Shop" – Macklemore & Ryan Lewis featuring Wanz; "Payphone" – Maroon 5 featuring Wiz Khalifa
Top Radio Songs Artist	Top Radio Song
**Rihanna**; Flo Rida; fun.; Maroon 5; Nicki Minaj	"**Somebody That I Used to Know" - Gotye featuring Kimbra**; "Locked Out of Heaven" – Bruno Mars; "Call Me Maybe" – Carly Rae Jepsen; "One More Night" – Maroon 5; "Payphone" – Maroon 5 featuring Wiz Khalifa
Top Streaming Artist	Top Streaming Song (Audio)
**Nicki Minaj**; Baauer; Drake; PSY; Rihanna	"**Somebody That I Used to Know" - Gotye featuring Kimbra**; "Call Me Maybe" – Carly Rae Jepsen; "Lights" – Ellie Goulding; "Some Nights" – fun.; "We Are Young" – fun. featuring Janelle Monáe
Top Streaming Song (Video)	Top Pop Artist
"**Gangnam Style" - PSY**; "Call Me Maybe" – Carly Rae Jepsen; "Thrift Shop" – Macklemore & Ryan Lewis featuring Wanz; "We Are Never Ever Getting Back Together" – Taylor Swift; "We Are Young" – fun. featuring Janelle Monáe	**One Direction**; Adele; Justin Bieber; Maroon 5; Bruno Mars
Top Pop Album	Top Pop Song
**21 - Adele**; Believe – Justin Bieber; Overexposed – Maroon 5; Take Me Home – One Direction; Up All Night – One Direction	**"Call Me Maybe" – Carly Rae Jepsen**; "Lights" – Ellie Goulding; "Locked Out of Heaven" – Bruno Mars; "One More Night" – Maroon 5; "Payphone" – Maroon 5 featuring Wiz Khalifa
Top R&B Artist	Top R&B Album
**Rihanna**; Alicia Keys; Chris Brown; Ne-Yo; Usher	**Unapologetic – Rihanna**; Girl on Fire – Alicia Keys; Fortune – Chris Brown; Channel Orange – Frank Ocean; Looking 4 Myself – Usher
Top R&B Song	Top Rap Artist
**"Diamonds" – Rihanna**; "Girl On Fire" – Alicia Keys featuring Nicki Minaj; "Adorn" – Miguel; "Thinkin Bout You" – Frank Ocean; "Heart Attack" – Trey Songz	**Nicki Minaj**; Drake; Flo Rida; Pitbull; PSY
Top Rap Album	Top Rap Song
**Pink Friday: Roman Reloaded – Nicki Minaj**; Based On A T.R.U. Story – 2 Chainz; Good Kid, M.A.A.D. City – Kendrick Lamar; The Heist – Macklemore & Ryan Lewis; God Forgives, I Don't – Rick Ross	**"Thrift Shop" – Macklemore & Ryan Lewis featuring Wanz**; "Whistle" – Flo Rida; "Wild Ones" – Flo Rida featuring Sia; "Mercy" – Kanye West, Big Sean, Pusha T, 2 Chainz; "Gangnam Style" – PSY
Top Country Artist	Top Country Group
**Taylor Swift**; Carrie Underwood; Hunter Hayes; Jason Aldean; Luke Bryan	**The Band Perry**; Thompson Square; Eli Young Band; Lady Antebellum; Florida Georgia Line
Top Country Album	Top Rock Artist
**Red – Taylor Swift**; Blown Away – Carrie Underwood; Night Train – Jason Aldean; Tuskegee – Lionel Richie; Tailgates & Tanlines – Luke Bryan	**fun.**; Bruce Springsteen; Coldplay; Gotye; Mumford & Sons
Top Rock Album	Top Rock Song
**Babel – Mumford & Sons**; Some Nights – fun.; My Head is an Animal – Of Monsters and Men; The World from the Side of the Moon – Phillip Phillips; The Lumineers – The Lumineers	**"Somebody That I Used to Know" – Gotye featuring Kimbra**; "Some Nights" – fun.; "We Are Young" – fun. featuring Janelle Monáe; "Home" – Phillip Phillips; "Ho Hey" - The Lumineers
Top Latin Artist	Top Latin Album
**Jenni Rivera**; Don Omar; Prince Royce; Romeo Santos; Shakira	**La Misma Gran Señora – Jenni Rivera**; Joyas Prestadas: Banda – Jenni Rivera; Joyas Prestadas: Pop – Jenni Rivera; Phase II – Prince Royce; Formula: Vol. 1 – Romeo Santos
Top Latin Song	Top Dance Artist
**"Ai Se Eu Te Pego" – Michel Teló**; "Hasta Que Salga el Sol" – Don Omar; "Dutty Love" – Don Omar featuring Natti Natasha; "Bailando Por El Mundo" – Juan Magan featuring Pitbull & El Cata; "Algo Me Gusta de Ti" – Wisin & Yandel featuring Chris Brown & T-Pain	**Madonna**; Calvin Harris; David Guetta; Skrillex; Swedish House Mafia
Top Dance Album	Top Dance Song
MDNA – Madonna; Nothing But the Beat – David Guetta; Album Title Goes Here – deadmau5; Sorry for Party Rocking — LMFAO; Bangarang – Skrillex	"Harlem Shake" – Baauer; "Titanium" – David Guetta featuring Sia; "Starships" – Nicki Minaj; "Gangnam Style" – PSY; "Where Have You Been" – Rihanna
Top EDM Artist	Top EDM Album
David Guetta; Calvin Harris; deadmau5; Skrillex; Swedish House Mafia	Bangarang – Skrillex; Scary Monsters and Nice Sprites – Skrillex; Nothing But the Beat – David Guetta; Album Title Goes Here – deadmau5; Until Now – Swedish House Mafia
Top EDM Song	Top Christian Artist
"Harlem Shake" – Baauer; "Feel So Close" – Calvin Harris; "Sweet Nothing" – Calvin Harris featuring Florence Welch; "Titanium" – David Guetta featuring Sia; "Don't You Worry Child" – Swedish House Mafia featuring John Martin	tobyMac; Casting Crowns; Chris Tomlin; Matt Redman; MercyMe
Top Christian Album	Top Christian Song
Eye on It – tobyMac; Come To The Well – Casting Crowns; Gravity – Lecrae; The Hurt & The Healer – MercyMe; WOW Hits 2013 – Various Artists	"10,000 Reasons (Bless The Lord)" – Matt Redman; "Redeemed" – Big Daddy Weave; "Where I Belong" – Building 429; "God's Not Dead (Like A Lion)" – newsboys; "Me Without You" – tobyMac
Top Social Artist (fan-voted)	Milestone Award (fan-voted)
Justin Bieber; Katy Perry; One Direction; Rihanna; Taylor Swift	Justin Bieber; Bruno Mars (runner-up); Taylor Swift (runner-up); Miguel; Pitbull; The Band Perry
Icon Award
Prince

=== Artists with multiple wins and nominations ===
Artists that received multiple nominations
Nominations	Artist
14	Maroon 5
13	fun.
12	Taylor Swift
10	One Direction
10	Rihanna
9	Carly Rae Jepsen
7	Flo Rida
7	Gotye
7	Justin Bieber
7	Nicki Minaj
6	David Guetta
6	PSY
5	Adele
5	Bruno Mars
5	Kimbra
5	Mumford & Sons
5	Skrillex
4	Calvin Harris
4	Coldplay
4	Janelle Monáe
4	Jenni Rivera
4	Macklemore & Ryan Lewis
4	Swedish House Mafia
4	Wiz Khalifa
3	Alicia Keys
3	Baauer
3	Chris Brown
3	deadmau5
3	Don Omar
3	Drake
3	Jason Aldean
3	Luke Bryan
3	Madonna
3	Pitbull
3	Sia
3	The Lumineers
3	tobyMac
3	Wanz
2	2 Chainz
2	Bruce Springsteen
2	Carrie Underwood
2	Casting Crowns
2	Frank Ocean
2	Hunter Hayes
2	Ellie Goulding
2	Matt Redman
2	MercyMe
2	Phillip Phillips
2	Prince Royce
2	Romeo Santos
2	Usher

Artists that received multiple awards
Wins	Artist
8	Taylor Swift
4	Gotye
4	Kimbra
4	Rihanna
3	Justin Bieber
3	Madonna
3	Nicki Minaj
3	One Direction
2	Baauer
2	Carly Rae Jepsen
2	Jenni Rivera
2	tobyMac

== Live-GIFs ==
Tumblr chose the 2013 Billboard Music Awards as the basis for their first live TV integration. Creative agency Deckhouse Digital was hired for the event, designing an innovative live-gif system which allowed them to produce animated GIFs during the broadcast, and post them directly to Billboard's tumblr page in real time. Users of the blogging site were able to view and share animated images of events unfolding on stage just minutes after watching them live on ABC.
