= Billboard Music Award for Top Billboard 200 Artist =

Annual American music award

Billboard Music Awards for Top Billboard 200 Artist
- Country: United States
- Presented by: Billboard
- First award: 1992
- Currently held by: Taylor Swift (2024)

Highlights
- Most wins: Taylor Swift (7)
- Most nominations: Taylor Swift (10)
- Website: billboardmusicawards.com

This article lists the winners and nominees for the Billboard Music Award for Top Billboard 200 Artist: The award was first given out during the 1992 ceremony, but was retired the following year. The award returned in 2011 and since its conception.

Taylor Swift has the most wins in this category with seven, Swift also has the most nominations with ten.

== Winners and nominees ==
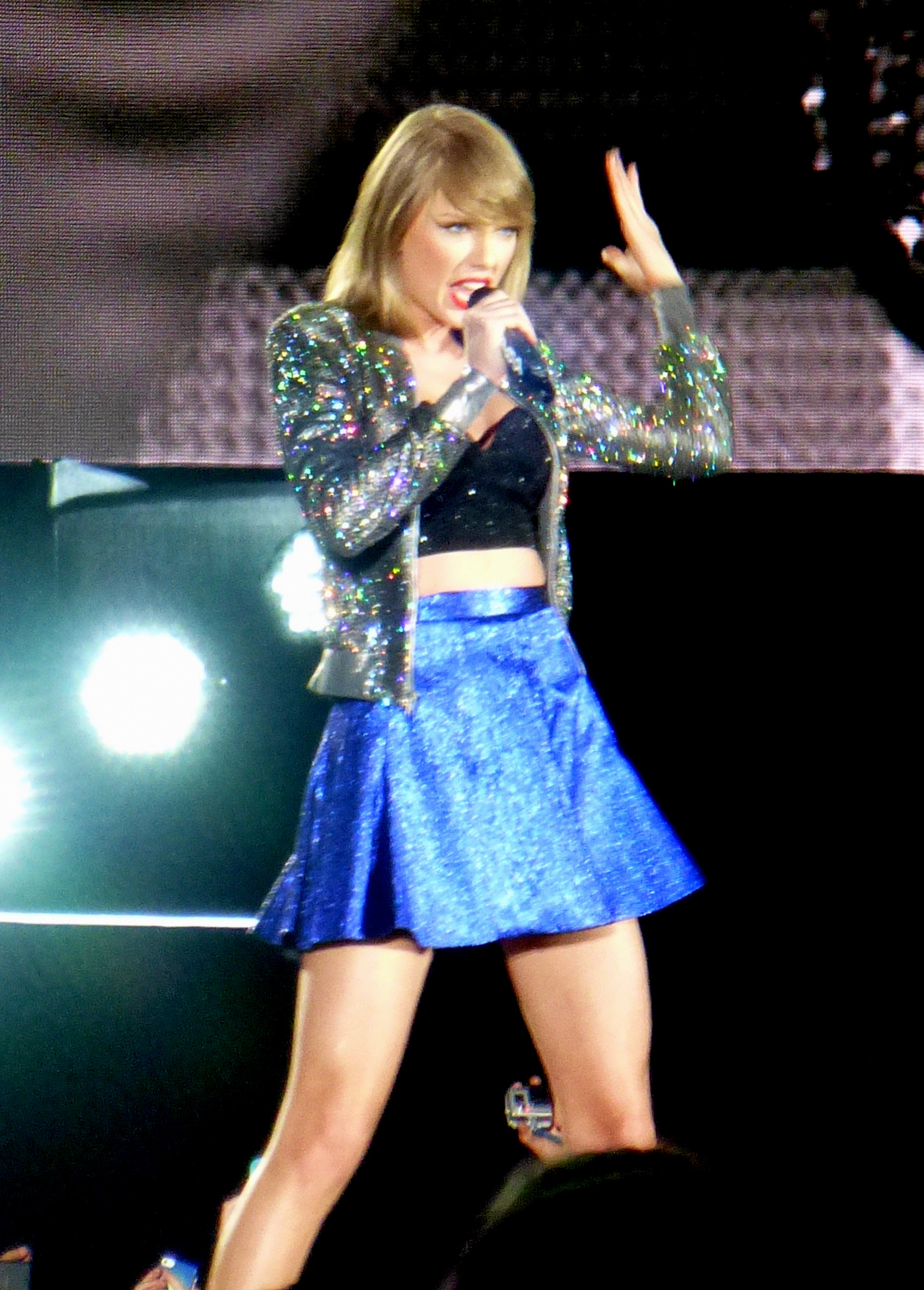
Taylor Swift has won the award seven times.

Winners are listed first and in bold.

=== 1990s ===
Year	Artist	Ref.
1992	**Garth Brooks**	
1993–99	—N/a	

=== 2010s ===
Year	Artist	Ref.
2010	—N/a	
2011	**Taylor Swift**	
2011	Justin Bieber	
2011	Susan Boyle	
2011	Eminem	
2011	Lady Antebellum	
2012	**Adele**	
2012	Justin Bieber	
2012	Michael Bublé	
2012	Lady Gaga	
2012	Lil Wayne	
2013	**Taylor Swift**	
2013	Adele	
2013	Justin Bieber	
2013	Mumford & Sons	
2013	One Direction	
2014	**Justin Timberlake**	
2014	Beyoncé	
2014	Luke Bryan	
2014	Eminem	
2014	One Direction	
2015	**Taylor Swift**	
2015	One Direction	
2015	Pentatonix	
2015	Ed Sheeran	
2015	Sam Smith	
2016	**Adele**	
2016	Justin Bieber	
2016	Drake	
2016	Taylor Swift	
2016	The Weeknd	
2017	**Drake**	
2017	Beyoncé	
2017	Prince	
2017	Twenty One Pilots	
2017	The Weeknd	
2018	**Drake**	
2018	Kendrick Lamar	
2018	Ed Sheeran	
2018	Chris Stapleton	
2018	Taylor Swift	
2019	**Drake**	
2019	Ariana Grande	
2019	Post Malone	
2019	Travis Scott	
2019	XXXTentacion	

=== 2020s ===
Year	Artist	Ref.
2020	**Post Malone**	
2020	Drake	
2020	Billie Eilish	
2020	Khalid	
2020	Taylor Swift	
2021	**Taylor Swift**	
2021	Drake	
2021	Juice Wrld	
2021	Post Malone	
2021	Pop Smoke	
2022	**Taylor Swift**	
2022	Drake	
2022	Juice WRLD	
2022	Morgan Wallen	
2022	Adele	
2023	**Taylor Swift**	
2023	Drake	
2023	Luke Combs	
2023	SZA	
2023	Morgan Wallen	
2024	**Taylor Swift**	
2024	Zach Bryan	
2024	Drake	
2024	SZA	
2024	Morgan Wallen	

== Multiple wins and nominations ==
=== Nominations ===
10 nominations

- Taylor Swift

8 nominations

- Drake

4 nominations

- Adele
- Justin Bieber

3 nominations

- One Direction
- Post Malone

2 nominations

- Beyoncé
- Eminem
- Juice WRLD
- Morgan Wallen
- The Weeknd
