= Billboard Music Award for Top Selling Song =

Annual American music award

- Awarded for: Song Sales
- Country: United States
- Presented by: Billboard
- First award: 2016
- Final award: 2023
- Currently held by: Taylor Swift

Highlights
- Most wins: BTS (2)
- Most nominations: Cardi B & BTS (3)

The Billboard Music Award for Top Selling Song was first presented at the 2016 Billboard Music Awards. "Hello" by Adele was the first song to be awarded this honor. As of 2022, BTS hold the record for most wins in this category, with two awards. BTS also hold the record for most nominations in this category, as a tie with Cardi B (each with three nods). The Chainsmokers, Drake, Halsey, Imagine Dragons, Megan Thee Stallion, Charlie Puth, and The Weeknd, are the only other artists with multiple nominations, each have been nominated twice.

== Recipients ==
Winner	Year	Other nominees	Ref.
"Hello" – Adele	2016	"Cheerleader" – Omi; "Fight Song" – Rachel Platten; "The Hills" – The Weeknd; "See You Again" – Wiz Khalifa feat. Charlie Puth	
"Can't Stop the Feeling!" – Justin Timberlake	2017	"Closer" – The Chainsmokers featuring Halsey; "Don't Let Me Down" – The Chainsmokers featuring Daya; "Heathens" – Twenty One Pilots; "One Dance" – Drake featuring WizKid and Kyla	
"Despacito" – Luis Fonsi and Daddy Yankee featuring Justin Bieber	2018	"Body Like a Back Road" – Sam Hunt; "Believer" – Imagine Dragons; "Thunder" – Imagine Dragons; "Perfect" – Ed Sheeran	
"Girls Like You" – Maroon 5 feat. Cardi B	2019	"I Like It" - Cardi B, Bad Bunny & J Balvin; "In My Feelings" - Drake; "Without Me" - Halsey; "Shallow" - Lady Gaga & Bradley Cooper	
"Old Town Road" – Lil Nas X feat. Billy Ray Cyrus	2020	"Someone You Loved" – Lewis Capaldi; "Bad Guy" – Billie Eilish; "Truth Hurts" – Lizzo; "God's Country" – Blake Shelton	
"Dynamite" – BTS	2021	"I Hope" – Gabby Barrett feat. Charlie Puth; "WAP" – Cardi B feat. Megan Thee Stallion; "Savage" – Megan Thee Stallion; "Blinding Lights" – The Weeknd	
"Butter" – BTS	2022	"Permission to Dance" – BTS; "Fancy Like" – Walker Hayes; "Levitating" – Dua Lipa; "Bad Habits" – Ed Sheeran	
"Anti-Hero" – Taylor Swift	2023	"Try That in a Small Town" – Jason Aldean; "Flowers" – Miley Cyrus; "Like Crazy" – Jimin; "Rich Men North of Richmond" – Oliver Anthony Music	
"A Bar Song (Tipsy)" – Shaboozey	2024	"Beautiful Things" – Benson Boone; "Standing Next To You" – Jungkook; "I Had Some Help" – Post Malone & Morgan Wallen; "Lose Control" – Teddy Swims	
