= Billboard Music Award for Top Hot 100 Song =

Annual American music award

This article lists the winners and nominees for the Billboard Music Award for Top Hot 100 Song. Since the creation of this category in 1990, Justin Bieber is the first and only artist to win this award multiple times (2).

== Winners and nominees ==
Winners are listed first and highlighted in bold.

=== 1990s ===
Year	Song	Artist	Ref
1990
1990	**"Hold On"**	**Wilson Phillips**	
1991
1991	**"(Everything I Do) I Do It for You"**	**Bryan Adams**	
1992
1992	**"End of the Road"**	**Boyz II Men**	
1992	"Baby Got Back"	Sir Mix-a-Lot	
1992	"Jump"	Kris Kross	
1992	"Save the Best for Last"	Vanessa Williams	
1993
1993	**"I Will Always Love You"**	**Whitney Houston**	
1994
1994	**"The Sign"**	**Ace of Base**	
1994	"I Swear"	All-4-One	
1994	"I'll Make Love to You"	Boyz II Men	
1994	"The Power of Love"	Celine Dion	
1995
1995	**"Gangsta's Paradise"**	**Coolio**	
1995	"Creep"	TLC	
1995	"Kiss from a Rose"	Seal	
1995	"Waterfalls"	TLC	
1996
1996	**"Macarena"**	**Los del Río**	
1996	"Because You Loved Me"	Celine Dion	
1996	"Nobody Knows"	The Tony Rich Project	
1996	"One Sweet Day"	Mariah Carey (feat. Boyz II Men)	
1997
1997	**"Candle in the Wind 1997"**	**Elton John**	
1997	"I'll Be Missing You"	Puff Daddy and Faith Evans (feat. 112)	
1997	"Un-Break My Heart"	Toni Braxton	
1997	"You Were Meant for Me"	Jewel	
1998
1998	**"Too Close"**	**Next**	
1998	"The Boy is Mine"	Brandy and Monica	
1998	"Truly Madly Deeply"	Savage Garden	
1998	"You're Still the One"	Shania Twain	
1999
1999	**"Believe"**	**Cher**	

=== 2000s ===
Year	Song	Artist	Ref.
2000	**"Breathe"**	**Faith Hill**	
2000	"I Wanna Know"	Joe	
2000	"Maria Maria"	Santana (feat. The Product G&B)	
2000	"Smooth"	Santana (feat. Rob Thomas)	
2001	**"Hanging by a Moment"**	**Lifehouse**	
2001	"All for You"	Janet Jackson	
2001	"Drops of Jupiter"	Train	
2001	"Fallin'"	Alicia Keys	
2002	**"How You Remind Me"**	**Nickelback**	
2002	"Dilemma"	Nelly (feat. Kelly Rowland)	
2002	"Foolish"	Ashanti	
2002	"Hot in Herre"	Nelly	
2003	—N/a		
2004	**"Yeah!"**	**Usher (feat. Lil Jon and Ludacris)**	
2004	"Burn"	Usher	
2004	"If I Ain't Got You"	Alicia Keys	
2004	"This Love"	Maroon 5	
2005	**"We Belong Together"**	**Mariah Carey**	
2005	"Since U Been Gone"	Kelly Clarkson	
2005	"Let Me Love You"	Mario	
2005	"Hollaback Girl"	Gwen Stefani	
2006	**"Bad Day"**	**Daniel Powter**	
2006	"Promiscuous"	Nelly Furtado (feat. Timbaland)	
2006	"Temperature"	Sean Paul	
2006	"Hips Don't Lie"	Shakira (feat. Wyclef Jean)	
2007–09	—N/a		

=== 2010s ===
Year	Song	Artist	Ref.
2010	—N/a		
2011	**"Dynamite"**	**Taio Cruz**	
2011	"California Gurls"	Katy Perry (feat. Snoop Dogg)	
2011	"Just the Way You Are"	Bruno Mars	
2011	"Love the Way You Lie"	Eminem (feat. Rihanna)	
2011	"OMG"	Usher (feat. Will.i.am)	
2012	**"Party Rock Anthem"**	**LMFAO (feat. Lauren Bennett & GoonRock)**	
2012	"E.T." (Remix)	Katy Perry (feat. Kanye West)	
2012	"Give Me Everything"	Pitbull (feat. Ne-Yo, Afrojack and Nayer)	
2012	"Moves Like Jagger"	Maroon 5 (feat. Christina Aguilera)	
2012	"Rolling in the Deep"	Adele	
2013	**"Somebody That I Used to Know"**	**Gotye (feat. Kimbra)**	
2013	"Call Me Maybe"	Carly Rae Jepsen	
2013	"One More Night"	Maroon 5	
2013	"Payphone"	Maroon 5 (feat. Wiz Khalifa)	
2013	"Some Nights"	Fun	
2014	**"Blurred Lines"**	**Robin Thicke (feat. Pharrell Williams and T.I.)**	
2014	"Radioactive"	Imagine Dragons	
2014	"Roar"	Katy Perry	
2014	"Royals"	Lorde	
2014	"Wrecking Ball"	Miley Cyrus	
2015	**"All About That Bass"**	**Meghan Trainor**	
2015	"Shake It Off"	Taylor Swift	
2015	"All of Me"	John Legend	
2015	"Fancy"	Iggy Azalea (feat. Charli XCX)	
2015	"Stay with Me"	Sam Smith	
2016	**"See You Again"**	**Wiz Khalifa (feat. Charlie Puth)**	
2016	"Can't Feel My Face"	The Weeknd	
2016	"Hello"	Adele	
2016	"The Hills"	The Weeknd	
2016	"Trap Queen"	Fetty Wap	
2017	**"Closer"**	**The Chainsmokers (feat. Halsey)**	
2017	"Can't Stop the Feeling!"	Justin Timberlake	
2017	"Don't Let Me Down"	The Chainsmokers (feat. Daya)	
2017	"Heathens"	Twenty One Pilots	
2017	"One Dance"	Drake (feat. Wizkid and Kyla)	
2018	**"Despacito"**	**Luis Fonsi and Daddy Yankee (feat. Justin Bieber)**	
2018	"Humble"	Kendrick Lamar	
2018	"That's What I Like"	Bruno Mars	
2018	"Rockstar"	Post Malone (feat. 21 Savage)	
2018	"Shape of You"	Ed Sheeran	
2019	**"Girls Like You"**	**Maroon 5 (feat. Cardi B)**	
2019	"Better Now"	Post Malone	
2019	"I Like It"	Cardi B, Bad Bunny & J Balvin	
2019	"Lucid Dreams"	Juice WRLD	
2019	"Sicko Mode"	Travis Scott	

=== 2020s ===
Year	Song	Artist	Ref.
2020	**"Old Town Road"**	**Lil Nas X (feat. Billy Ray Cyrus)**	
2020	"Bad Guy"	Billie Eilish	
2020	"Someone You Loved"	Lewis Capaldi	
2020	"Truth Hurts"	Lizzo	
2020	"Señorita”	Shawn Mendes & Camila Cabello	
2021	**"Blinding Lights”**	**The Weeknd**	
2021	"Mood"	24kGoldn (feat. Iann Dior)	
2021	"I Hope"	Gabby Barrett (feat. Charlie Puth)	
2021	"Go Crazy"	Chris Brown & Young Thug	
2021	"Rockstar"	DaBaby (feat. Roddy Ricch)	
2022	**"Stay"**	**The Kid Laroi & Justin Bieber**	
2022	"Kiss Me More"	Doja Cat (feat. SZA)	
2022	"Levitating"	Dua Lipa	
2022	"Good 4 U"	Olivia Rodrigo	
2022	"Save Your Tears"	The Weeknd & Ariana Grande	
2023	**"Last Night"**	**Morgan Wallen**	
2023	"Flowers"	Miley Cyrus	
2023	"Creepin'"	Metro Boomin, The Weeknd & 21 Savage	
2023	"Anti-Hero"	Taylor Swift	
2023	"Kill Bill"	SZA	
2024	**"Lose Control"**	**Teddy Swims**	
2024	"Beautiful Things"	Benson Boone	
2024	"Lovin on Me"	Jack Harlow	
2024	"I Had Some Help"	Post Malone (feat. Morgan Wallen)	
2024	"A Bar Song (Tipsy)"	Shaboozey	

== Multiple awards and nominations ==
=== Wins ===
2 wins

- Justin Bieber

=== Nominations ===
5 nominations
- The Weeknd

4 nominations

- Maroon 5

3 nominations

- Boyz II Men
- Post Malone
- Katy Perry

2 nominations

- Adele
- Justin Bieber
- Cardi B
- Mariah Carey
- The Chainsmokers
- Miley Cyrus
- Celine Dion
- Alicia Keys
- Nelly
- Charlie Puth
- Santana
- Taylor Swift
- SZA
- TLC
- Usher
- Wiz Khalifa
