= Billboard Music Award for Top Male Artist =

Annual American music award

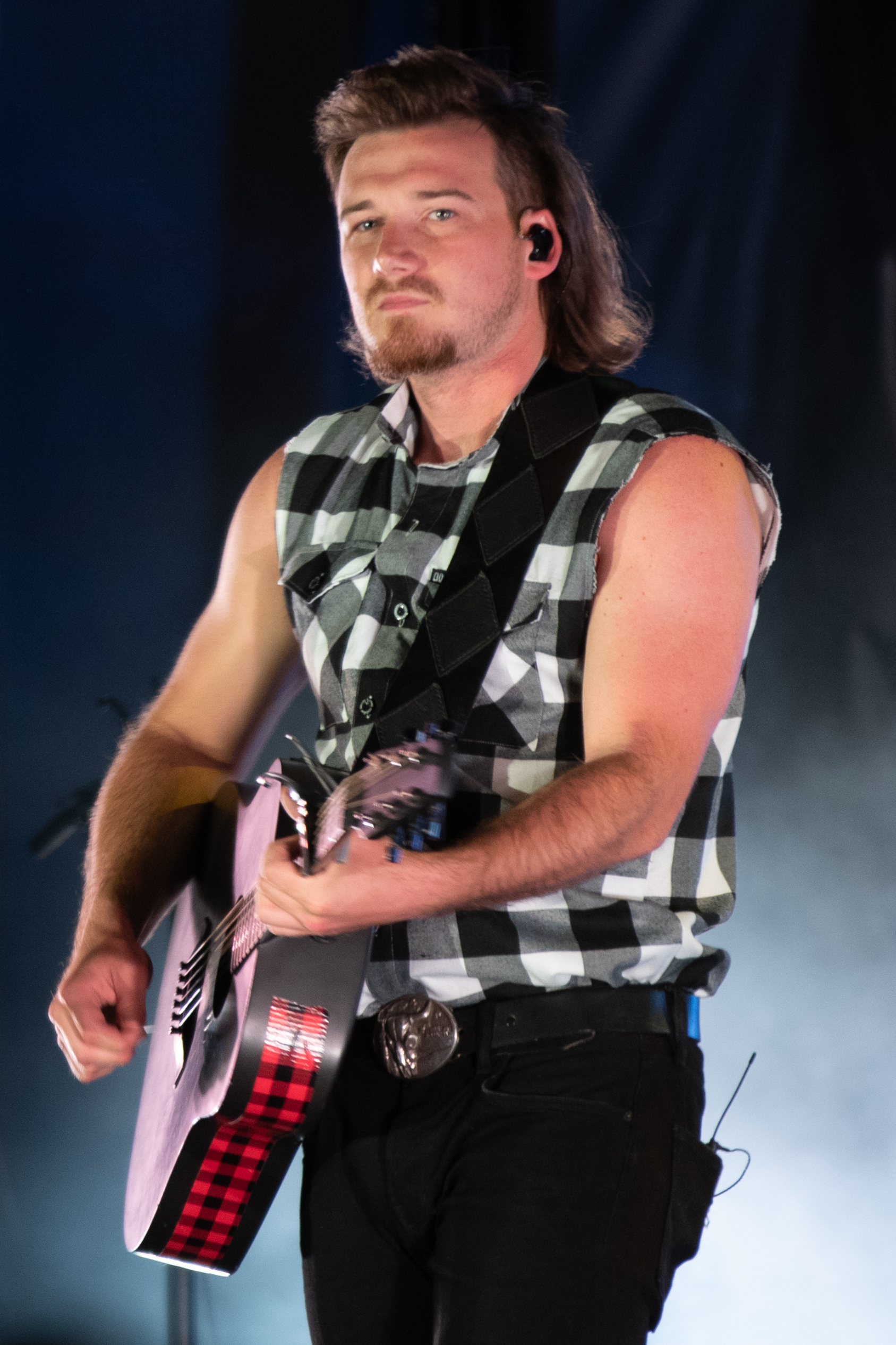
Morgan Wallen, winner of the award in 2025 and 2026

The Billboard Music Award winners for Top Male Artist. Drake (3), Justin Bieber (2), and Morgan Wallen (2) are the only artists to win this award multiple times.

== Winners and nominees ==
Winners are listed first and highlighted in bold.

=== 1990s ===
Year	Artist	Ref.
1994	**Snoop Dogg**	
1995-1998	—N/a	
1999	**Ricky Martin**	
1999	Jay Z	
1999	R. Kelly	
1999	DMX	

=== 2000s ===
Year	Artist	Ref.
2000	**Sisqó**	
2000	Marc Anthony	
2000	Joe	
2000	Eminem	
2001	**Shaggy**	
2001	Lenny Kravitz	
2001	Ja Rule	
2001	Nelly	
2002	**Nelly**	
2002	Eminem	
2002	Ja Rule	
2002	Usher	
2003-2005	—N/a	
2006	**Chris Brown**	
2006	Justin Timberlake	
2006	Ne-Yo	
2006	Sean Paul	
2007-2009	—N/a	

=== 2010s ===
Year	Artist	Ref.
2010	—N/a	
2011	**Eminem**	
2011	Justin Bieber	
2011	Drake	
2011	Bruno Mars	
2011	Usher	
2012	**Lil Wayne**	
2012	Justin Bieber	
2012	Chris Brown	
2012	Bruno Mars	
2012	Drake	
2013	**Justin Bieber**	
2013	Jason Aldean	
2013	Drake	
2013	Flo Rida	
2013	Bruno Mars	
2014	**Justin Timberlake**	
2014	Luke Bryan	
2014	Drake	
2014	Eminem	
2014	Bruno Mars	
2015	**Sam Smith**	
2015	Drake	
2015	Pharrell Williams	
2015	Ed Sheeran	
2015	Justin Timberlake	
2016	**Justin Bieber**	
2016	Drake	
2016	Fetty Wap	
2016	Ed Sheeran	
2016	The Weeknd	
2017	**Drake**	
2017	Justin Bieber	
2017	Future	
2017	Shawn Mendes	
2017	The Weeknd	
2018	**Ed Sheeran**	
2018	Drake	
2018	Kendrick Lamar	
2018	Bruno Mars	
2018	Post Malone	
2019	**Drake**	
2019	Post Malone	
2019	Travis Scott	
2019	Ed Sheeran	
2019	XXXTentacion	

=== 2020s ===
Year	Artist	Ref.
2020	**Post Malone**	
2020	DaBaby	
2020	Khalid	
2020	Lil Nas X	
2020	Ed Sheeran	
2021	**The Weeknd**	
2021	Drake	
2021	Pop Smoke	
2021	Lil Baby	
2021	Juice WRLD	
2022	**Drake**	
2022	Ed Sheeran	
2022	Justin Bieber	
2022	Lil Nas X	
2022	The Weeknd	
2023	**Morgan Wallen**	
2023	Zach Bryan	
2023	Luke Combs	
2023	Drake	
2023	The Weeknd	
2024	**Morgan Wallen**	
2024	Zach Bryan	
2024	Luke Combs	
2024	Drake	
2024	Post Malone	

== Multiple wins and nominations ==
=== Wins ===
Rank	Artist	Awards won	Years won
1	Drake	3	2017, 2019, and 2022
2	Justin Bieber	2	2013 and 2016
2	Morgan Wallen	2	2023 and 2024

=== Nominations ===
Winning years are highlighted in bold.

Rank	Artist	Nominations	Years
1	Drake	13	2011, 2012, 2013, 2014, 2015, 2016, **2017**, 2018, **2019**, 2021, **2022**, 2023 and 2024
2	Justin Bieber	6	2011, 2012, **2013**, **2016**, 2017 and 2022
2	Ed Sheeran	6	2015, 2016, **2018**, 2019, 2020 and 2022
3	Bruno Mars	5	2011, 2012, 2013, 2014 and 2018
3	The Weeknd	5	2016, 2017, **2021**, 2022 and 2023
4	Eminem	4	2000, 2002, **2011** and 2014
5	Justin Timberlake	3	2006, **2014** and 2015
5	Post Malone	3	2018, 2019 and **2020**
6	Ja Rule	2	2001 and 2002
6	Nelly	2	2001 and **2002**
6	Usher	2	2002 and 2011
6	Chris Brown	2	**2006** and 2012
6	Zach Bryan	2	2023 and 2024
6	Luke Combs	2	2023 and 2024
6	Morgan Wallen	2	**2023** and **2024**
