= Billboard Music Award for Top R&B Male Artist =

Annual American music award

- Country: United States
- Presented by: Billboard
- First award: 2018
- Currently held by: Tommy Richman (2024)

Highlights
- Most wins: The Weeknd (4)
- Most nominations: The Weeknd (6)
- Website: billboardmusicawards.com

The following list shows the winners and nominees for the Billboard Music Award for Top R&B Male Artist. The award was first given in 2018 when gendered categories were added to the award show with Bruno Mars winning the first award. The Weeknd is the only artist to win this award multiple times with three wins and also is the most nominated artist with six nominations.

== Winners and nominees ==
Listed below are the winners of the award for each year, as well as the other nominees.

Table key
‡	Indicates the winner

Year	Artist	Ref.
2018	Bruno Mars ‡	
2018	Khalid	
2018	The Weeknd	
2019	Khalid	
2019	The Weeknd ‡	
2019	XXXTentacion	
2020	Chris Brown	
2020	Khalid ‡	
2020	The Weeknd	
2021	Chris Brown	
2021	Justin Bieber	
2021	The Weeknd ‡	
2022	Giveon	
2022	Khalid	
2022	The Weeknd ‡	
2023	Chris Brown	
2023	Miguel	
2023	The Weeknd ‡	
2024	Brent Faiyaz	
2024	The Weeknd	
2024	Tommy Richman ‡	
