= Billboard Music Award for Top Billboard 200 Album =

Annual American music award

Billboard Music Awards for Top Billboard 200 Album
- Country: United States
- Presented by: Billboard
- First award: 1991
- Currently held by: The Tortured Poets Department by Taylor Swift (2024)

Highlights
- Most wins: Taylor Swift (3)
- Most nominations: Taylor Swift (10)
- Website: billboardmusicawards.com

This article lists the winners and nominees for the Billboard Music Award for Top Billboard 200 Album. The award has been given since 1991 and since its conception only five artists have won the award twice: 50 Cent, Adele, Drake, Eminem, and Taylor Swift.

== Winners and nominees ==
Winners are listed first and highlighted in bold.

=== 1990s ===
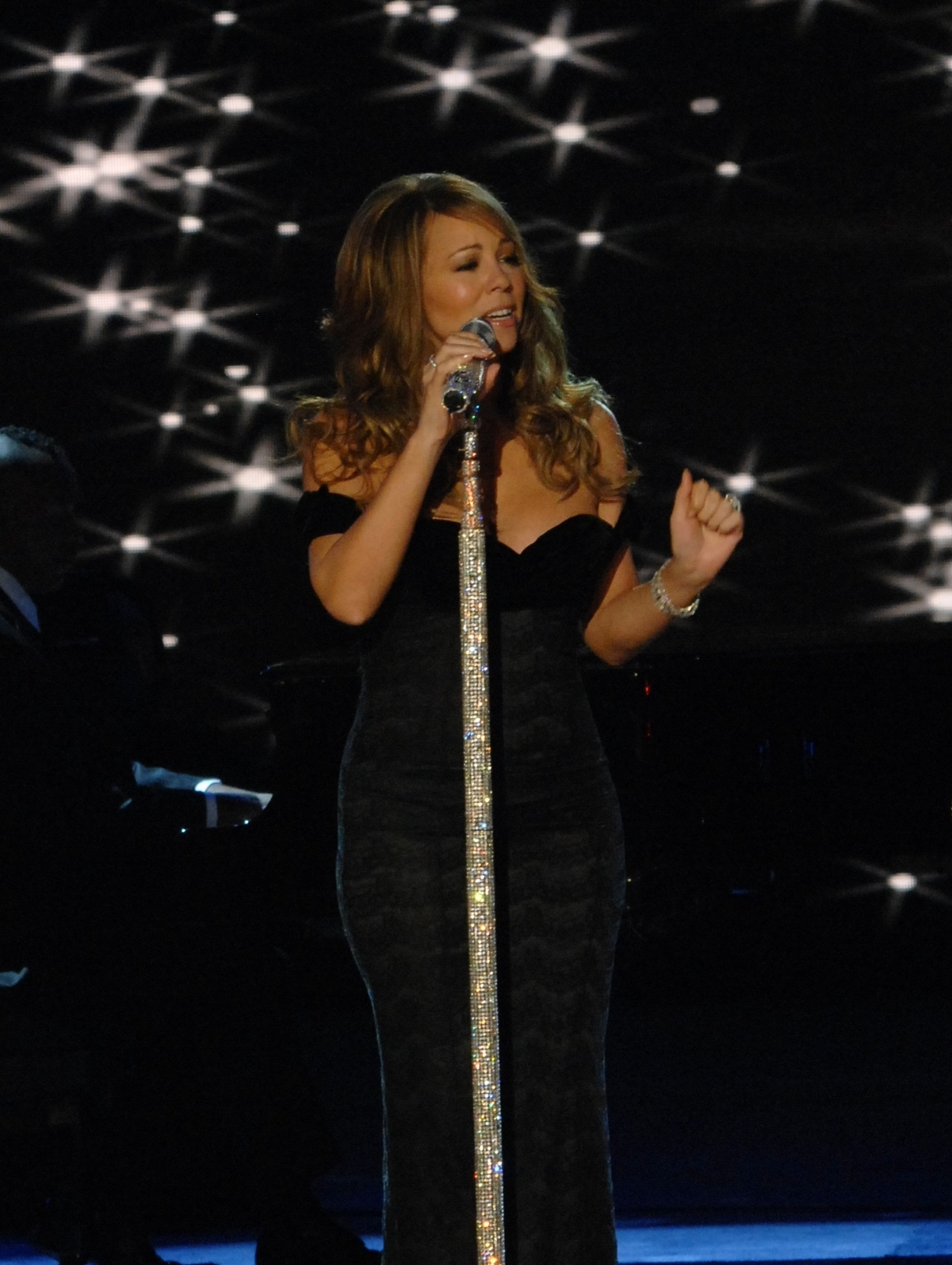
Mariah Carey was inaugural winner.

Year	Album	Artist	Ref.
1991	**Mariah Carey**	**Mariah Carey**	
1992	—N/a		
1993	**The Bodyguard**	**Whitney Houston**	
1994	—N/a		
1995	**Cracked Rear View**	**Hootie & the Blowfish**	
1995	Hell Freezes Over	The Eagles	
1995	The Hits	Garth Brooks	
1995	II	Boyz II Men	
1996	**Jagged Little Pill**	**Alanis Morissette**	
1996	Daydream	Mariah Carey	
1996	Falling into You	Celine Dion	
1996	Waiting to Exhale: Original Soundtrack Album	Whitney Houston	
1997	**Spice**	**Spice Girls**	
1997	Falling into You	Celine Dion	
1997	Space Jam: Music From and Inspired By the Motion Picture	Various Artists	
1997	Tragic Kingdom	No Doubt	
1998	**Titanic: Music from the Motion Picture**	**Celine Dion**	
1998	Backstreet Boys	Backstreet Boys	
1998	Let's Talk About Love	Celine Dion	
1998	Sevens	Garth Brooks	
1999	**Millennium**	**Backstreet Boys**	
1999	...Baby One More Time	Britney Spears	
1999	Come On Over	Shania Twain	
1999	*NSYNC	*NSYNC	

=== 2000s ===
Year	Album	Artist	Ref.
2000	**No Strings Attached**	***NSYNC**	
2000	The Marshall Mathers LP	Eminem	
2000	Oops!...I Did It Again	Britney Spears	
2000	Supernatural	Santana	
2001	**1**	**The Beatles**	
2001	Black & Blue	Backstreet Boys	
2001	Chocolate Starfish and the Hot Dog Flavored Water	Limp Bizkit	
2001	Hot Shot	Shaggy	
2002	**The Eminem Show**	**Eminem**	
2002	M!ssundaztood	P!nk	
2002	Nellyville	Nelly	
2002	Weathered	Creed	
2003	**Get Rich or Die Tryin'**	**50 Cent**	
2003	Come Away With Me	Norah Jones	
2003	Home	Dixie Chicks	
2003	Up!	Shania Twain	
2004	**Confessions**	**Usher**	
2004	Closer	Josh Groban	
2004	The Diary of Alicia Keys	Alicia Keys	
2004	Speakerboxxx/The Love Below	Outkast	
2005	**The Massacre**	**50 Cent**	
2005	American Idiot	Green Day	
2005	The Emancipation of Mimi	Mariah Carey	
2005	Encore	Eminem	
2006	**Some Hearts**	**Carrie Underwood**	
2006	All the Right Reasons	Nickelback	
2006	High School Musical	High School Musical Cast	
2006	Me and My Gang	Rascal Flatts	
2007–09	—N/a		

=== 2010s ===
Year	Album	Artist	Ref.
2010	—N/a		
2011	**Recovery**	**Eminem**	
2011	The Gift	Susan Boyle	
2011	My World 2.0	Justin Bieber	
2011	Need You Now	Lady Antebellum	
2011	Speak Now	Taylor Swift	
2012	**21**	**Adele**	
2012	Born This Way	Lady Gaga	
2012	Tha Carter IV	Lil Wayne	
2012	Christmas	Michael Bublé	
2012	Take Care	Drake	
2013	**Red**	**Taylor Swift**	
2013	21	Adele	
2013	Babel	Mumford & Sons	
2013	Take Me Home	One Direction	
2013	Up All Night	One Direction	
2014	**The 20/20 Experience**	**Justin Timberlake**	
2014	Beyoncé	Beyoncé	
2014	Crash My Party	Luke Bryan	
2014	The Marshall Mathers LP 2	Eminem	
2014	Nothing Was the Same	Drake	
2015	**1989**	**Taylor Swift**	
2015	In the Lonely Hour	Sam Smith	
2015	That's Christmas to Me	Pentatonix	
2015	V	Maroon 5	
2015	x	Ed Sheeran	
2016	**25**	**Adele**	
2016	1989	Taylor Swift	
2016	Beauty Behind The Madness	The Weeknd	
2016	Purpose	Justin Bieber	
2016	x	Ed Sheeran	
2017	**Views**	**Drake**	
2017	Anti	Rihanna	
2017	Blurryface	Twenty One Pilots	
2017	Lemonade	Beyoncé	
2017	Starboy	The Weeknd	
2018	**Damn**	**Kendrick Lamar**	
2018	More Life	Drake	
2018	Stoney	Post Malone	
2018	÷	Ed Sheeran	
2018	Reputation	Taylor Swift	
2019	**Scorpion**	**Drake**	
2019	Invasion of Privacy	Cardi B	
2019	Beerbongs & Bentleys	Post Malone	
2019	Astroworld	Travis Scott	
2019	?	XXXTentacion	

=== 2020s ===
Year	Album	Artist	Ref.
2020	**When We All Fall Asleep, Where Do We Go?**	**Billie Eilish**	
2020	Thank U, Next	Ariana Grande	
2020	Free Spirit	Khalid	
2020	Hollywood's Bleeding	Post Malone	
2020	Lover	Taylor Swift	
2021	**Shoot for the Stars, Aim for the Moon**	**Pop Smoke**	
2021	Legends Never Die	Juice Wrld	
2021	My Turn	Lil Baby	
2021	Folklore	Taylor Swift	
2021	After Hours	The Weeknd	
2022	**Sour**	**Olivia Rodrigo**	
2022	30	Adele	
2022	Planet Her	Doja Cat	
2022	Certified Lover Boy	Drake	
2022	Dangerous: The Double Album	Morgan Wallen	
2023	**One Thing at a Time**	**Morgan Wallen**	
2023	Her Loss	Drake & 21 Savage	
2023	Heroes & Villains	Metro Boomin	
2023	Midnights	Taylor Swift	
2023	SOS	SZA	
2024	**The Tortured Poets Department**	**Taylor Swift**	
2024	Zach Bryan	Zach Bryan	
2024	For All the Dogs	Drake	
2024	Stick Season	Noah Kahan	
2024	1989 (Taylor's Version)	Taylor Swift	

== Multiple wins and nominations ==
=== Wins ===
3 wins

- Taylor Swift

2 wins

- 50 Cent
- Adele
- Eminem
- Drake

=== Nominations ===
10 nominations
- Taylor Swift

8 nominations

- Drake

5 nominations

- Eminem

4 nominations

- Adele
- Celine Dion

3 nominations

- Backstreet Boys
- Post Malone
- The Weeknd

2 nominations

- *NSYNC
- 50 Cent
- Beyoncé
- Justin Bieber
- Garth Brooks
- Mariah Carey
- Whitney Houston
- One Direction
- Ed Sheeran
- Britney Spears
- Shania Twain
- Morgan Wallen
