= List of awards and nominations received by TLC =

TLC awards and nominations
Awards and nominations
Award	Wins	Nominations
American Music Awards	1	7
Billboard Music Awards	4	14
Grammy Awards	5	16
MOBO Awards	2	3
MTV Video Music Awards	5	16
Pop Awards	1	1
Kids Choice Awards	2	7
Teen Choice Awards	1	4
Soul Train Awards	5	9

Totals (Note: Certain award groups do not simply award one winner. They acknowledge several different recipients, have runners-up, and have third place. Since this is a specific recognition and is different from losing an award, runner-up mentions are considered wins in this award tally. For simplification and to avoid errors, each award in this list has been presumed to have had a prior nomination.)
- Wins: 27
- Nominations: 80

This is a list of awards and nominations received by American girl group TLC.

== American Music Awards ==
Created by Dick Clark in 1973, the American Music Awards is an annual music awards ceremony and one of several major annual American music awards shows. TLC has won two award from seven nominations.

Year	Nominee / work	Award	Result
1993	TLC	Favorite Pop/Rock New Artist	Nominated
1993	TLC	Favorite Rap/Hip-Hop New Artist	Nominated
1993	TLC	Favorite Rap/Hip-Hop Artist	Nominated
1996	CrazySexyCool	Favorite Soul/R&B Album	Nominated
1996	TLC	Favorite Soul/R&B Band, Duo or Group	Nominated
1996	TLC	Favorite Artist of the Year	Won
2000	TLC	Favorite Band, Duo or Group – Soul/Rhythm & Blues	Won

== Billboard Music Awards ==
The Billboard Music Awards is an annual music awards ceremony and one of several major annual American music awards shows. TLC has won four Billboard Music Awards out of their fourteen nominations.

Year	Nominee / work	Award	Result
1992	TLC	Number One Hot 100 single Artist	Nominated
1992	TLC	Debut Artist of the Year	Nominated
1995	TLC	Artist of the Year	Won
1995	TLC	Top R&B Artist	Won
1995	TLC	Top Female Artist	Won
1995	CrazySexyCool	Top R&B Album	Nominated
1995	"Creep"	Top R&B Song	Won
1995	"Creep"	Single of the Year	Nominated
1995	"Waterfalls"	Single of the Year	Nominated
1999	TLC	Artist of the Year	Nominated
1999	TLC	Top 200 Artist	Nominated
1999	TLC	Top Duo/Group	Nominated
1999	"No Scrubs"	Top Hot 100 Song	Nominated
1999	"No Scrubs"	Top R&B Song	Nominated

== Grammy Awards ==
The Grammy Awards are an annual music awards ceremony and one of several major annual American music awards shows. TLC has won five awards from sixteen nominations.

Year	Nominee / work	Award	Result
1993	Ain't 2 Proud 2 Beg	Best R&B Song	Nominated
1996	CrazySexyCool	Best R&B Album	Won
1996	"Creep"	Best R&B Performance by a Duo or Group with Vocals	Won
1996	"Creep"	Best R&B Song	Nominated
1996	"Waterfalls"	Record of the Year	Nominated
1996	"Waterfalls"	Best Pop Performance by a Duo or Group with Vocals	Nominated
1996	Red Light Special	Best R&B Song	Nominated
2000	Fanmail	Album of the Year	Nominated
2000	Fanmail	Best R&B Album	Won
2000	"No Scrubs"	Record of the Year	Nominated
2000	"No Scrubs"	Best R&B Performance by a Duo or Group with Vocals	Won
2000	"No Scrubs"	Best R&B Song	Won
2000	"Unpretty"	Best Pop Performance by a Duo or Group with Vocals	Nominated
2000	"Unpretty"	Best Short Form Music Video	Nominated
2003	"Girl Talk"	Best R&B Performance by a Duo or Group with Vocals	Nominated
2004	"Hands Up"	Best R&B Performance by a Duo or Group with Vocals	Nominated

== MOBO Awards ==
The MOBO Awards stands for "Music of Black Origin" and was established in 1996 by Kanya King and Andy Ruffell. The MOBO Award show is held annually in the United Kingdom to recognise artists of any ethnicity or nationality performing black music. In 2009, the awards ceremony was held for the first time in Glasgow. Prior to that, it had been held in London. In 2011, the ceremony returned for a second time to Scotland. The awards then moved to Leeds for 2015.

Year	Nominee / work	Award	Result
1996	"Waterfalls"	Best R&B/Soul Album – Group, Band or Duo	Nominated
1999	No Scrubs	Best Video	Won
2012	TLC	Contribution to Music	Won

== MTV Video Music Awards ==
An MTV Video Music Award (commonly abbreviated as a VMA) is an award presented by the cable channel MTV to honor the best in the music video medium. TLC have won 5 awards from 16 nominations.

Year	Nominee / work	Award	Result
1995	"Waterfalls"	Video of the Year	Won
1995	"Waterfalls"	Best Group Video	Won
1995	"Waterfalls"	Best R&B Video	Won
1995	"Waterfalls"	Viewer's Choice	Won
1995	"Waterfalls"	Breakthrough Video	Nominated
1995	"Waterfalls"	Best Direction in a Video	Nominated
1995	"Waterfalls"	Best Special Effects in a Video	Nominated
1995	"Waterfalls"	Best Art Direction in a Video	Nominated
1995	"Waterfalls"	Best Editing in a Video	Nominated
1995	"Waterfalls"	Best Cinematography in a Video	Nominated
1999	"No Scrubs"	Best Group Video	Won
1999	"No Scrubs"	Best Hip-Hop Video	Nominated
1999	"No Scrubs"	Viewer's Choice	Nominated
1999	"No Scrubs"	Best Direction in a Video	Nominated
1999	"No Scrubs"	Best Art Direction in a Video	Nominated
1999	"No Scrubs"	Best Editing in a Video	Nominated

== Nickelodeon Kids' Choice Awards ==
The Nickelodeon Kids' Choice Awards is an annual awards show, that honors the year's biggest television, movie, and music acts, as voted by the people. TLC won two awards out of the seven nominations.

Year	Nominee / work	Award	Result
1992	Ain't 2 Proud 2 Beg	Favorite Song	Nominated
1995	TLC	Favorite Group	Nominated
1995	Creep	Favorite Song	Won
1996	TLC	Favorite Group	Won
1996	Waterfalls	Favorite Song	Nominated
1997	TLC	Favorite Group	Nominated
2000	TLC	Favorite Group	Nominated

== Pop Awards ==
The Pop Awards are presented annually by Pop Magazine, honoring the best in popular music.

Year	Nominee / work	Award	Result
2018	TLC	Lifetime Achievement Award	Won

== Teen Choice Awards ==
The Teen Choice Awards were established in 1999 to honor the year's biggest achievements in music, movies, sports and television, being voted by young people aged between 13 and 19. TLC won one award out of the four nominations.

Year	Nominee / work	Award	Result
1999	TLC	Choice Music Group	Won
1999	FanMail	Choice Music Album	Nominated
1999	No Scrubs	Choice Music Video	Nominated
2000	TLC	Choice Pop Group	Nominated

== See also ==
- List of best-selling music artists in the United States
- List of best-selling girl groups

Preceded by Ace of Base	Billboard Artist of the Year; 1996	Succeeded by Alanis Morissette
