= Billboard Music Award for Top Female Artist =

Annual American music award

Billboard Music Awards for Top Female Artist
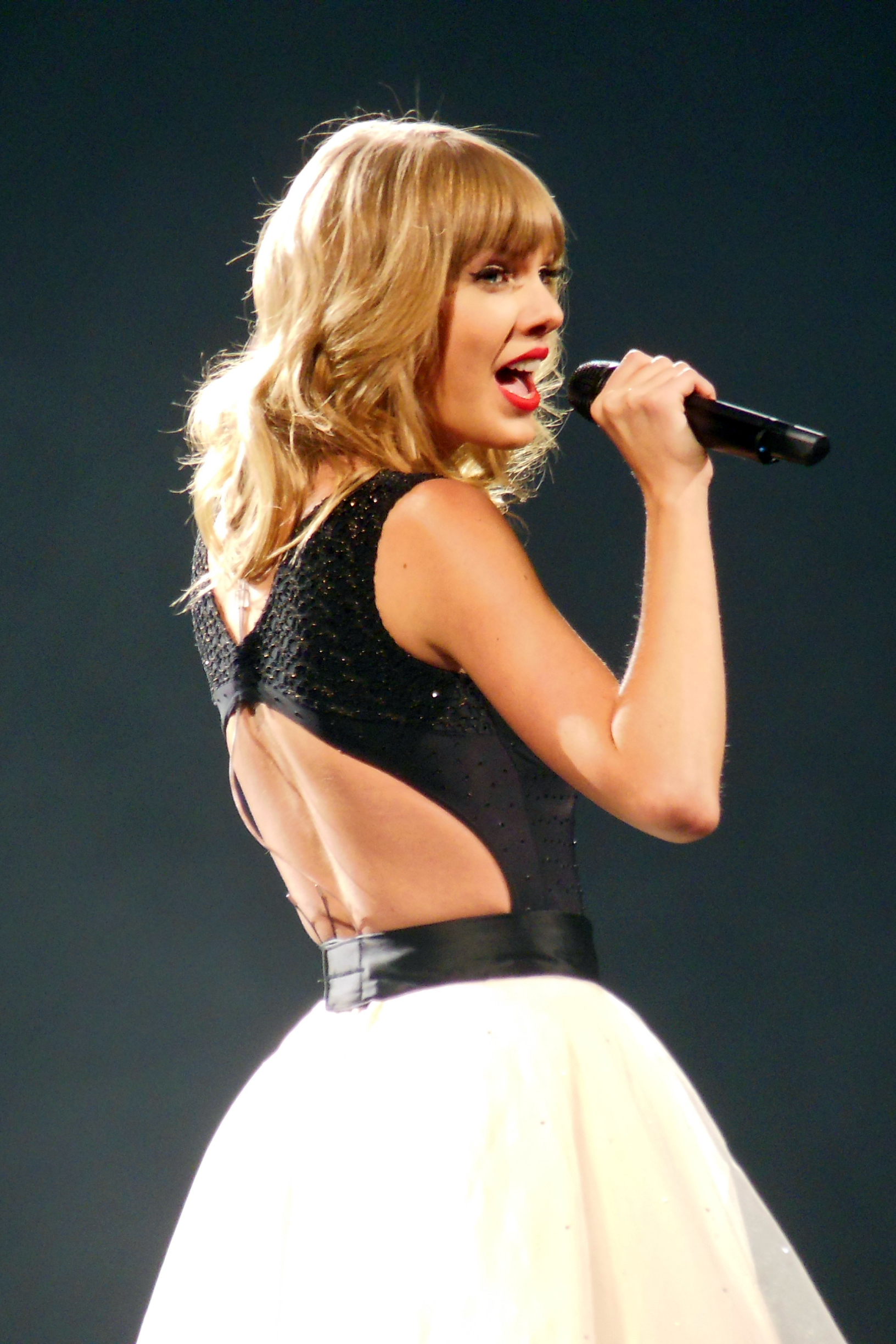
- Taylor Swift is the most awarded artist in this category
- Country: United States
- Presented by: Billboard
- First award: 1990
- Currently held by: Taylor Swift (2024)

Highlights
- Most wins: Taylor Swift (6)
- Most nominations: Taylor Swift (11)
- Website: billboardmusicawards.com

This article lists the winners and nominees for the Billboard Music Award for Top Female Artist. This award has been given since 1990. Taylor Swift is the all-time winner with six and is also the most nominated artist with eleven. There are only five women who won the award more than once: Taylor Swift, Rihanna, Alicia Keys, Adele, and Mariah Carey.

== Winners and nominees ==
Winners are listed first and highlighted in bold.

=== 1990s ===
Year	Artist	Ref.
1990	**Janet Jackson**	
1991	**Mariah Carey**	
1992	—N/a	
1993	**Whitney Houston**	
1994	**Mariah Carey**	
1995	**TLC**	
1996	**Alanis Morissette**	
1997	**LeAnn Rimes**	
1998	**Shania Twain**	
1998	Celine Dion	
1998	Janet Jackson	
1998	LeAnn Rimes	
1999	**Britney Spears**	
1999	Cher	
1999	Shania Twain	

=== 2000s ===
Year	Artist	Ref.
2000	**Christina Aguilera**	
2000	Britney Spears	
2000	Faith Hill	
2000	P!nk	
2001	**Alicia Keys**	
2001	Destiny's Child	
2001	Dido	
2001	Janet Jackson	
2001	Jennifer Lopez	
2002	**Ashanti**	
2002	Avril Lavigne	
2002	Jennifer Lopez	
2002	P!nk	
2003	—N/a	
2004	**Alicia Keys**	
2004	Beyoncé	
2004	Britney Spears	
2004	Norah Jones	
2005	—N/a	
2006	**Rihanna**	
2006	Beyoncé	
2006	Kelly Clarkson	
2006	Mary J. Blige	
2007 – 09	—N/a	

=== 2010s ===
Year	Artist	Ref.
2010	—N/a	
2011	**Rihanna**	
2011	Katy Perry	
2011	Kesha	
2011	Lady Gaga	
2011	Taylor Swift	
2012	**Adele**	
2012	Katy Perry	
2012	Lady Gaga	
2012	Nicki Minaj	
2012	Rihanna	
2013	**Taylor Swift**	
2013	Adele	
2013	Carly Rae Jepsen	
2013	Nicki Minaj	
2013	Rihanna	
2014	**Katy Perry**	
2014	Beyoncé	
2014	Lorde	
2014	Miley Cyrus	
2014	Rihanna	
2015	**Taylor Swift**	
2015	Ariana Grande	
2015	Iggy Azalea	
2015	Katy Perry	
2015	Meghan Trainor	
2016	**Adele**	
2016	Ariana Grande	
2016	Rihanna	
2016	Selena Gomez	
2016	Taylor Swift	
2017	**Beyoncé**	
2017	Adele	
2017	Ariana Grande	
2017	Rihanna	
2017	Sia	
2018	**Taylor Swift**	
2018	Camila Cabello	
2018	Cardi B	
2018	Demi Lovato	
2018	Halsey	
2019	**Ariana Grande**	
2019	Cardi B	
2019	Ella Mai	
2019	Halsey	
2019	Taylor Swift	

=== 2020s ===
Year	Artist	Ref.
2020	**Billie Eilish**	
2020	Ariana Grande	
2020	Halsey	
2020	Lizzo	
2020	Taylor Swift	
2021	**Taylor Swift**	
2021	Ariana Grande	
2021	Billie Eilish	
2021	Dua Lipa	
2021	Megan Thee Stallion	
2022	**Olivia Rodrigo**	
2022	Adele	
2022	Doja Cat	
2022	Dua Lipa	
2022	Taylor Swift	
2023	**Taylor Swift**	
2023	Beyoncé	
2023	Miley Cyrus	
2023	Olivia Rodrigo	
2023	SZA	
2024	**Taylor Swift**	
2024	Billie Eilish	
2024	Chappell Roan	
2024	Sabrina Carpenter	
2024	SZA	

== Multiple wins and nominations ==
=== Wins ===
Rank	Artist	Awards won	Years won
1	Taylor Swift	6	2013, 2015, 2018, 2021, 2023 and 2024
2	Adele	2	2012 and 2016
2	Alicia Keys	2	2001 and 2004
2	Mariah Carey	2	1991 and 1994
2	Rihanna	2	2006 and 2011

=== Nominations ===
Winning years are highlighted in bold.

Rank	Artist	Nominations	Years
1	Taylor Swift	11	2011, **2013**, **2015**, 2016, **2018**, 2019, 2020, **2021,** 2022, **2023** and **2024**
2	Rihanna	7	**2006**, **2011**, 2012, 2013, 2014, 2016 and 2017
3	Ariana Grande	6	2015, 2016, 2017, **2019**, 2020 and 2021
4	Adele	5	2011, **2012**, **2016**, 2017 and 2022
4	Beyoncé	5	2004, 2006, 2014, **2017** and 2023
5	Katy Perry	4	2011, 2012, **2014** and 2015
