= Billboard Music Award for Top Hot 100 Artist =

Annual American music award

This article lists the winners and nominees for the Billboard Music Award for Top Hot 100 Artist. The award has been given out since 1992 and since its conception only Destiny's Child, Usher, Drake, Taylor Swift and The Weeknd have won the award twice.

== Winners and nominees ==
Winners are listed first and highlighted in bold.

=== 1990s ===
Year	Artist	Ref
1992
1992	**Boyz II Men**	
1993
1993	**Whitney Houston**	
1994 – 95	—N/a	
1996
1996	**Mariah Carey**	
1996	Celine Dion	
1996	LL Cool J	
1996	Los del Río	
1997
1997	**Elton John**	
1997	Toni Braxton	
1997	Jewel	
1997	Spice Girls	
1998
1998	**Usher**	
1998	Next	
1998	Savage Garden	
1998	Shania Twain	
1999	—N/a	

=== 2000s ===
Year	Artist	Ref
2000
2000	**Destiny's Child**	
2000	Christina Aguilera	
2000	Faith Hill	
2000	Santana	
2001
2001	**Destiny's Child**	
2001	Janet Jackson	
2001	Jennifer Lopez	
2001	Matchbox Twenty	
2002
2002	**Ashanti**	
2002	Nelly	
2002	Nickelback	
2002	Usher	
2003	—N/a	
2004
2004	**Usher**	
2004	Alicia Keys	
2004	Maroon 5	
2004	Outkast	
2005
2005	**50 Cent**	
2005	Mariah Carey	
2005	Kelly Clarkson	
2005	Green Day	
2006 – 09	—N/a	

=== 2010s ===
Year	Artist	Ref
2010	—N/a	
2011
2011	**Katy Perry**	
2011	Kesha	
2011	Bruno Mars	
2011	Rihanna	
2011	Usher	
2012
2012	**Adele**	
2012	LMFAO	
2012	Bruno Mars	
2012	Katy Perry	
2012	Rihanna	
2013
2013	**Maroon 5**	
2013	Flo Rida	
2013	Fun	
2013	Rihanna	
2013	Taylor Swift	
2014
2014	**Imagine Dragons**	
2014	Miley Cyrus	
2014	Lorde	
2014	Katy Perry	
2014	Justin Timberlake	
2015
2015	**Taylor Swift**	
2015	Iggy Azalea	
2015	Ariana Grande	
2015	Sam Smith	
2015	Meghan Trainor	
2016
2016	**The Weeknd**	
2016	Justin Bieber	
2016	Drake	
2016	Fetty Wap	
2016	Taylor Swift	
2017
2017	**Drake**	
2017	The Chainsmokers	
2017	Rihanna	
2017	Twenty One Pilots	
2017	The Weeknd	
2018
2018	**Ed Sheeran**	
2018	Imagine Dragons	
2018	Kendrick Lamar	
2018	Bruno Mars	
2018	Post Malone	
2019
2019	**Drake**	
2019	Ariana Grande	
2019	Cardi B	
2019	Juice Wrld	
2019	Post Malone	

=== 2020s ===
Year	Artist	Ref
2020
2020	**Post Malone**	
2020	DaBaby	
2020	Billie Eilish	
2020	Khalid	
2020	Lil Nas X	
2021
2021	**The Weeknd**	
2021	DaBaby	
2021	Drake	
2021	Dua Lipa	
2021	Pop Smoke	
2022
2022	**Olivia Rodrigo**	
2022	Justin Bieber	
2022	Doja Cat	
2022	Drake	
2022	The Weeknd	
2023
2023	**Morgan Wallen**	
2023	Luke Combs	
2023	Drake	
2023	Taylor Swift	
2023	SZA	
2024
2024	**Taylor Swift**	
2024	Zach Bryan	
2024	Sabrina Carpenter	
2024	Billie Eilish	
2024	Morgan Wallen	

== Multiple wins and nominations ==
=== Wins ===
2 wins

- Destiny's Child
- Usher
- Drake
- Taylor Swift
- The Weeknd

=== Nominations ===
6 nominations

- Drake

5 nominations

- Taylor Swift

4 nominations

- Rihanna
- Usher
- The Weeknd

3 nominations

- Katy Perry
- Bruno Mars

2 nominations

- Justin Bieber
- Mariah Carey
- DaBaby
- Destiny's Child
- Imagine Dragons
- Maroon 5
- Ariana Grande
