= 1995 Billboard Music Awards =

American music award ceremony

- Location: New York Coliseum, New York City, New York, U.S.
- Hosted by: Jon Stewart

Highlights
- Most awards: TLC (3)

Television/radio coverage
- Network: Fox

Finalists and winners at the 1995 Billboard Music Awards.

== Winners ==
Artist of the Year	Album of the Year
TLC	Hootie & the Blowfish - Cracked Rear View
Rock Artist of the Year	Rock Track of the Year
Live	Collective Soul - December
Country Artist of the Year	Country Album of the Year
John Michael Montgomery	Garth Brooks - The Hits
Country Single of the Year	Single of the Year
John Michael Montgomery - Sold	Coolio - Gangsta's Paradise
Contemporary Jazz Artist of the Year	Adult Contemporary Single of the Year
Kenny G	Martin Page - In the House of Stone and Light
New Artist of the Year	Latin Artist of the Year
Real McCoy	Selena
R&B Artist of the Year	R&B Album of the Year
TLC	Mary J. Blige - My Life
R&B Single of the Year	Rap Artist of the Year
TLC - Creep	The Notorious B.I.G.
Rap Single of the Year	First Ever Hot 100 Debut at #1
The Notorious B.I.G - One More Chance/Stay with Me	Michael Jackson - You Are Not Alone
Producer of the Year	Songwriter of the Year
Babyface	Babyface
Artist Achievement Award	Century Award
Janet Jackson	Joni Mitchell
