= Billboard Music Award for Top Rock Artist =

Annual American music award

The following list includes the nominees and winners for Billboard Music Award for Top Rock Artist.

== Winners and nominees ==
Winners are listed first and highlighted in bold.

=== 1990s ===
Year	Artist	Ref.
1990	**Aerosmith**	
1991	**R.E.M.**	
1992	**U2**	
1993	**Aerosmith**	
1993	Stone Temple Pilots	
1993	Soul Asylum	
1993	Lenny Kravitz	
1994	—N/a	
1995	**Live**	
1995	Collective Soul	
1995	Pearl Jam	
1995	Tom Petty	
1996-1998	—N/a	
1999	**Creed**	
1999	Collective Soul	
1999	Lenny Kravitz	
1999	Metallica	

=== 2000s ===
Year	Artist	Ref.
2000	**Creed**	
2000	3 Doors Down	
2000	Metallica	
2000	Godsmack	
2001	**Godsmack**	
2001	3 Doors Down	
2001	Linkin Park	
2001	Staind	
2002	**Puddle of Mudd**	
2002	Creed	
2002	Nickelback	
2002	Staind	
2003	**Audioslave**	
2003	3 Doors Down	
2003	Disturbed	
2003	Trapt	
2004	**Linkin Park**	
2004	Incubus	
2004	Jet	
2004	Three Days Grace	
2005	**Green Day**	
2005	Breaking Benjamin	
2005	Papa Roach	
2005	Velvet Revolver	
2006	**Nickelback**	
2006	Disturbed	
2006	Red Hot Chili Peppers	
2006	Shinedown	
2007-2009	—N/a	

=== 2010s ===
Year	Artist	Ref.
2010	—N/a	
2011	**Train**	
2011	Linkin Park	
2011	Kings of Leon	
2011	Mumford & Sons	
2011	Muse	
2012	**Coldplay**	
2012	Foster the People	
2012	The Black Keys	
2012	Foo Fighters	
2012	Mumford & Sons	
2013	**Fun**	
2013	Coldplay	
2013	Gotye	
2013	Mumford & Sons	
2013	Bruce Springsteen	
2014	**Imagine Dragons**	
2014	Capital Cities	
2014	Fall Out Boy	
2014	Lorde	
2014	Passenger	
2015	**Hozier**	
2015	Bastille	
2015	Coldplay	
2015	Fall Out Boy	
2015	Lorde	
2016	**Twenty One Pilots**	
2016	Fall Out Boy	
2016	Elle King	
2016	Walk the Moon	
2016	X Ambassadors	
2017	**Twenty One Pilots**	
2017	Coldplay	
2017	The Lumineers	
2017	Metallica	
2017	X Ambassadors	
2018	**Imagine Dragons**	
2018	Linkin Park	
2018	Portugal. The Man	
2018	Tom Petty and the Heartbreakers	
2018	Twenty One Pilots	
2019	**Imagine Dragons**	
2019	Lovelytheband	
2019	Panic! At The Disco	
2019	Queen	
2019	Twenty One Pilots	

=== 2020s ===
Year	Artist	Ref.
2020	**Panic! at the Disco**	
2020	Imagine Dragons	
2020	Tool	
2020	Twenty One Pilots	
2020	Tame Impala	
2021	**Machine Gun Kelly**	
2021	AJR	
2021	AC/DC	
2021	Five Finger Death Punch	
2021	Twenty One Pilots	
2022	**Glass Animals**	
2022	Imagine Dragons	
2022	Machine Gun Kelly	
2022	Maneskin	
2022	Twenty One Pilots	
2023	**Zach Bryan**	
2023	Jelly Roll	
2023	Noah Kahan	
2023	Steve Lacy	
2023	Stephen Sanchez	
2024	**Zach Bryan**	
2024	Hozier	
2024	Jelly Roll	
2024	Noah Kahan	
2024	Linkin Park	

== Superlatives ==
The following individuals received two or more Top Rock Artist Awards:

Wins	Artist
3	Imagine Dragons
2	Aerosmith
2	Zach Bryan
2	Creed
2	Twenty One Pilots

The following individuals received two or more Top Rock Artist nominations:

Nominations	Artist
7	Twenty One Pilots
5	Imagine Dragons
5	Linkin Park
4	Coldplay
3	3 Doors Down
3	Creed
3	Fall Out Boy
3	Mumford & Sons
3	Metallica
2	Aerosmith
2	Zach Bryan
2	Collective Soul
2	Godsmack
2	Hozier
2	Noah Kahan
2	Lenny Kravitz
2	Lorde
2	Jelly Roll
2	Staind
2	Machine Gun Kelly
2	Panic! At The Disco
2	X Ambassadors
