= 1999 Billboard Music Awards =

Annual American music awards ceremony

- Date: December 8, 1999
- Location: MGM Grand Garden Arena, Las Vegas
- Country: United States
- Hosted by: Kathy Griffin and Adam Carolla

Highlights
- Most awards: Britney Spears (5)
- Most nominations: Britney Spears (8)

Television/radio coverage
- Network: Fox
- Viewership: 8.1% (Nielsen ratings)
- Produced by: Paul Flattery, Michael Levitt

The 1999 Billboard Music Awards took place on December 8, 1999, at the MGM Grand Garden Arena in Las Vegas. Hosted by Kathy Griffin and Adam Carolla, the ceremony honored the best-performing music releases between December 1998 and November 1999, and their respective artists.

Britney Spears was both the most-nominated and most-awarded artist of the year, winning five awards including Top New Artist and Top Female Artist. Country singer and songwriter Emmylou Harris was bestowed with the Century Award in honour of her many creative achievements, while Aerosmith received the Artist Achievement Award for their longstanding body of work. Garth Brooks and Mariah Carey were recipients of the inaugural Male and Female Artist of the Decade awards respectively. The Red Hot Chili Peppers were presented with a special award for their single "Scar Tissue", which set the then-all-time record for most weeks at number-one on Billboard's Hot Modern Rock Tracks chart earlier in the year.

== Performances ==
Artist(s)	Song(s)	Ref(s)
Jennifer Lopez	"Waiting for Tonight"	
Red Hot Chili Peppers	"Scar Tissue" "Red Hot Mama" (with Snoop Dogg)	
Britney Spears	"...Baby One More Time" "(You Drive Me) Crazy"	
LeAnn Rimes	"Crazy"	
Metallica	"Until It Sleeps"(with the San Francisco Symphony)	
Juvenile	"Back That Thang Up"	
Ricky Martin	"Shake Your Bon-Bon"	
Mariah Carey	"I Still Believe"	
Celine Dion	"That's The Way It Is"	

== Presenters ==
- Jessica Simpson & Sugar Ray – presented Top Billboard 200 Album
- Jennifer Love Hewitt & Diego Serrano – introduced Britney Spears
- Lou Bega, Mae Young & The Fabulous Moolah – presented Top Rap Artist
- Brian McKnight & Vitamin C – presented Top Country Artist of the Year
- Ben Affleck – presented the Artist Achievement Award to Aerosmith
- Mary J Blige & Everlast – presented Top R&B/Hip Hop Artist
- Christina Aguilera & 98 Degrees – presented Top Male Artist
- Dennis Hopper – introduced LeAnn Rimes
- Mila Kunis & Laura Prepon – introduced *NSYNC
- *NSYNC – presented Top Female Artist
- Mandy Moore & Darren Hayes – announced the winners in the Rock/Modern Rock categories
- Oscar De La Hoya – introduced Ricky Martin
- Patti LaBelle – presented Female Artist of the Decade to Mariah Carey
- Sarah McLachlan – presented the Century Award to Emmylou Harris
- James Hetfield & Lars Ulrich – presented Artist of the Year

== Winners and nominees ==
Britney Spears was the most-nominated artist with eight nominations, followed by TLC who received six. R. Kelly and Cher tied with five nominations apiece, while Whitney Houston, Shania Twain, Jay-Z, and the Backstreet Boys each earned four.

Winners are listed first and highlighted in bold.

Artist of the Year	Top New Artist
**Backstreet Boys**; Britney Spears; TLC; Shania Twain	**Britney Spears**; Christina Aguilera; Lou Bega; Jennifer Lopez
Top Male Artist	Top Female Artist
**Ricky Martin**; Jay-Z; R. Kelly; DMX	**Britney Spears**; Cher; Whitney Houston; Shania Twain
Top Billboard 200 Artist	Top Billboard 200 Album
**Backstreet Boys**; Britney Spears; TLC; Shania Twain	**Backstreet Boys – Millennium**; *NSYNC – *NSYNC; Britney Spears – ...Baby One More Time; Shania Twain – Come On Over
Female Singles Artist of the Year	Top Female Albums Artist of the Year
**"...Baby One More Time" – Britney Spears**	**Britney Spears – ...Baby One More Time**
Top Duo/Group	Top Hot 100 Song
**Backstreet Boys**; 98 Degrees; Sugar Ray; TLC	**"Believe" – Cher**; "Heartbreak Hotel" – Whitney Houston (featuring Faith Evans and Kelly Price); "Angel of Mine" – Monica; "No Scrubs" – TLC
Top Male Hot 100 Artist of the Year	Top Female Hot 100 Artist of the Year
**Ricky Martin**; R. Kelly; Jay-Z; Tim McGraw	**Britney Spears**; Cher; Whitney Houston; Brandy Norwood
Top R&B/Hip Hop Artist	Top R&B Album Artist of the Year
**R. Kelly**; Faith Evans; Lauryn Hill; Jay-Z	**Flesh of My Flesh, Blood of My Blood – DMX**; 400 Degreez – Juvenile; The Miseducation of Lauryn Hill – Lauryn Hill; R. – R. Kelly
Top R&B Album of the Year	Top R&B Single of the Year
**400 Degreez – Juvenile**; Flesh of My Flesh, Blood of My Blood – DMX; The Miseducation of Lauryn Hill – Lauryn Hill; R. – R. Kelly	**"Fortunate" – Maxwell**; "Nobody's Supposed to Be Here" – Deborah Cox; "Heartbreak Hotel" – Whitney Houston (featuring Faith Evans and Kelly Price); "No Scrubs" – TLC
Top Rap Artist	Top Rap Single
**Jay-Z**; Busta Rhymes; JT Money; Solé	**"Who Dat" – JT Money featuring Solé**; "What's It Gonna Be?!" – Busta Rhymes (featuring Janet Jackson); "Ghetto Cowboy" – Mo Thugs (featuring Bone Thugs-N-Harmony); "Somebody Like Me – Silkk the Shocker
Top Country Artist of the Year	Top Country Album of the Year
**Dixie Chicks**; Martina McBride; Tim McGraw; George Strait	**Wide Open Spaces – Dixie Chicks**
Top Country Group/Duo of the Year	Adult Contemporary Track Of The Year
**Dixie Chicks**	**"Angel" – Sarah McLachlan**
Top Rock Artist of the Year	Top Rock Single of the Year
**Creed**; Collective Soul; Lenny Kravitz; Metallica	**"One" – Creed**; "Heavy" – Collective Soul; "What It's Like" – Everlast; "Scar Tissue" – Red Hot Chili Peppers
Top Modern Rock Artist	Top Modern Rock Track
**The Offspring**	**"My Own Worst Enemy" – Lit**
Top Catalog Artist of the Year	Top Catalog Album of the Year
**Metallica**	**Metallica – Metallica**
Century Award	Artist Achievement Award
**Emmylou Harris**	**Aerosmith**
Male Artist of the Decade	Female Artist of the Decade
**Garth Brooks**	**Mariah Carey**
