= Billboard Music Award for Top R&B Artist =

Annual American music award

This page lists the winners and nominees for the Billboard Music Award for Top R&B Artist. This category was one of the first created and has been given out since the award's conception in 1990. R. Kelly holds the record for most wins in this category with four.

== Winners and nominees ==
Winners are listed first and highlighted in bold.

=== 1990s ===
Year	Artist	Ref.
1990	**Janet Jackson**	
1991	**Whitney Houston**	
1992	**Jodeci**	
1992	R. Kelly and Public Announcement	
1992	LeVert	
1992	Michael Jackson	
1993	**Dr. Dre**	
1993	Janet Jackson	
1993	Silk	
1993	SWV	
1994	**R. Kelly**	
1994	Babyface	
1994	Toni Braxton	
1994	Tevin Campbell	
1995	**TLC**	
1995	Boyz II Men	
1995	Brandy	
1995	The Notorious B.I.G.	
1996	**R. Kelly**	
1996	Mariah Carey	
1996	LL Cool J	
1996	Monica	
1997	**Dru Hill**	
1997	112	
1997	Toni Braxton	
1997	Tupac Shakur	
1998	**Usher**	
1998	Jon B.	
1998	Mase	
1998	Next	
1999	**R. Kelly**	
1999	Faith Evans	
1999	Lauryn Hill	
1999	Jay Z	

=== 2000s ===
Year	Artist	Ref.
2000	**Sisqó**	
2001	**R. Kelly**	
2001	Ja Rule	
2001	Jay Z	
2001	Musiq	
2002	**Ashanti**	
2002	B2K	
2002	Clipse	
2002	Tweet	
2003	**50 Cent**	
2003	Aaliyah	
2003	Jay Z	
2003	R. Kelly	
2004	**Usher**	
2004	R. Kelly	
2004	Alicia Keys	
2004	Kanye West	
2005	**50 Cent**	
2005	Mariah Carey	
2005	Destiny's Child	
2005	Fantasia	
2006	**Mary J. Blige**	
2006	Jamie Foxx	
2006	Ne-Yo	
2006	T.I.	
2007–09	—N/a	

=== 2010s ===
Year	Artist	Ref.
2010	—N/a	
2011	**Usher**	
2011	Alicia Keys	
2011	Monica	
2011	Rihanna	
2011	Trey Songz	
2012	**Chris Brown**	
2012	Beyoncé	
2012	CeeLo Green	
2012	Miguel	
2012	Rihanna	
2013	**Rihanna**	
2013	Chris Brown	
2013	Alicia Keys	
2013	Ne-Yo	
2013	Usher	
2014	**Justin Timberlake**	
2014	Beyoncé	
2014	Rihanna	
2014	Robin Thicke	
2014	Pharrell Williams	
2015	**Pharrell Williams**	
2015	Beyoncé	
2015	Chris Brown	
2015	John Legend	
2015	Trey Songz	
2016	**The Weeknd**	
2016	Chris Brown	
2016	Jeremih	
2016	Rihanna	
2016	Bryson Tiller	
2017	**Beyoncé**	
2017	Bruno Mars	
2017	Frank Ocean	
2017	Rihanna	
2017	The Weeknd	
2018	**Bruno Mars**	
2018	Chris Brown	
2018	Khalid	
2018	SZA	
2018	The Weeknd	
2019	**Ella Mai**	
2019	H.E.R.	
2019	Khalid	
2019	The Weeknd	
2019	XXXTentacion	

=== 2020s ===
Year	Artist	Ref.
2020	**Khalid**	
2020	Chris Brown	
2020	Lizzo	
2020	Summer Walker	
2020	The Weeknd	
2021	**The Weeknd**	
2021	Jhené Aiko	
2021	Justin Bieber	
2021	Chris Brown	
2021	Doja Cat	
2022	**Doja Cat**	
2022	Giveon	
2022	Silk Sonic	
2022	Summer Walker	
2022	The Weeknd	
2023	**SZA**	
2023	Beyoncé	
2023	Chris Brown	
2023	Rihanna	
2023	The Weeknd	
2024	**SZA**	
2024	Brent Faiyaz	
2024	Tommy Richman	
2024	Tyla	
2024	The Weeknd	

== Multiple wins and nominations ==
=== Wins ===
4 wins

- R. Kelly

3 wins

- Usher

2 wins

- 50 Cent
- SZA
- The Weeknd

=== Nominations ===
9 nominations
- The Weeknd

8 nominations

- Chris Brown

7 nominations

- Rihanna

6 nominations

- R. Kelly

5 nominations

- Beyoncé

4 nominations

- Usher

3 nominations

- Jay Z
- Alicia Keys
- Khalid
- SZA

2 nominations

- 50 Cent
- Toni Braxton
- Mariah Carey
- Doja Cat
- Janet Jackson
- Bruno Mars
- Monica
- Ne-Yo
- Trey Songz
- Summer Walker
- Pharrell Williams
