= 1993 Billboard Music Awards =

American music award ceremony

- Location: Universal Amphitheatre, Universal City, California, U.S.
- Hosted by: Phil Collins

Highlights
- Most awards: Whitney Houston (11)

Television/radio coverage
- Network: Fox

Finalists and winners at the 1993 Billboard Music Awards.

== Winners ==
#1 World Artist	#1 World Single
Whitney Houston	Whitney Houston - I Will Always Love You
#1 Album	#1 Soundtrack Album
Whitney Houston - The Bodyguard	Whitney Houston - The Bodyguard
#1 Album With Most Weeks at No. 1	#1 Debut Artist
Whitney Houston - The Bodyguard	Dr. Dre
#1 R&B Singles Artist	#1 Country Artist
Whitney Houston - I Will Always Love You	Garth Brooks
#1 R&B Album	#1 Pop Artist
Whitney Houston - The Bodyguard	Garth Brooks
#1 Country Singles Artist	#1 Country Albums Artist
Garth Brooks	Garth Brooks
#1 Rap Single	#1 Adult Contemporary Artist
Illegal - We Getz Busy	Jon Secada
The 1993 Billboard Tribute to Artistic Excellence	#1 Dance Single
Rod Stewart	RuPaul - Supermodel
#1 12" Dance Single	#1 Rock Track
RuPaul - Supermodel	Stone Temple Pilots - Plush
#1 Adult Contemporary Single	#1 Hot 100 Singles Artist
Vanessa Williams and Brian McKnight - Love Is	Whitney Houston
#1 Hot 100 Single	#1 R&B Artist
Whitney Houston - I Will Always Love You	Dr. Dre
Single With Most Weeks at #1	#1 R&B Albums Artist
Whitney Houston - I Will Always Love You	Dr. Dre
#1 R&B Single	#1 Rock Artist
Whitney Houston - I Will Always Love You	Aerosmith
Century Award
Buddy Guy
