= 1998 Billboard Music Awards =

American music award ceremony

- Date: December 7, 1998
- Location: Las Vegas, Nevada, U.S.
- Hosted by: Kathy Griffin and Andy Dick

Television/radio coverage
- Network: Fox

Finalists and winners at the 1998 Billboard Music Awards.

== Winners ==
Artist of the Year	Best Selling Country Single of the Year
Usher	Shania Twain - "You're Still the One"
R&B Artist of the Year	Hot 100 Singles Artist of the Year
Usher	Usher
R&B Singles Airplay Track of the Year	Female Artist of the Year
Next - "Too Close"	Shania Twain
Hot 100 Singles Female Artist of the Year	Country Singles Sales Artist of the Year
Shania Twain	LeAnn Rimes
Rap Single of the Year	Modern Rock Track of the Year
Lord Tariq and Peter Gunz - "Deja Vu (Uptown Baby)"	Marcy Playground - "Sex and Candy"
Special Billboard Hot 100 Award for the most No. 1s ever by a female artist	Rap Artist of the Year
Mariah Carey	Mase
Adult Top 40 Track of the Year	Hot 100 Single of the Year
Natalie Imbruglia - "Torn"	Next - "Too Close"
R&B Single of the Year	R&B Singles Artist of the Year
Next - "Too Close"	Next
Rock Track of the Year	Hot 100 Singles Duo or Group of the Year
Kenny Wayne Shepherd Band - "Blue on Black"	Next
Blues Album of the Year	New Artist of the Year
Kenny Wayne Shepherd Band - Trouble Is...	Next
R&B Album of the Year	New R&B Artist of the Year
Lauryn Hill - The Miseducation of Lauryn Hill	Next
Special Billboard Hot 100 Award	R&B Group of the Year
LeAnn Rimes	Next
Female Country Artist of the Year	Contemporary Christian Artist of the Year
LeAnn Rimes	LeAnn Rimes - You Light Up My Life: Inspirational Songs
Modern Rock Artist of the Year	Country Artist of the Year
Everclear	Garth Brooks
Country Album of the Year	Male Album of the Year
Garth Brooks - Sevens	Garth Brooks
Country Singles Artist of the Year	Country Albums Artist of the Year
Garth Brooks	Garth Brooks
Century Award	Group Album of the Year
James Taylor	Backstreet Boys - Backstreet Boys
R&B Albums Artist of the Year	Adult Contemporary Group of the Year
Jay-Z	Backstreet Boys
Album of the Year	Female Album of the Year
Celine Dion - Titanic	Celine Dion - Let's Talk About Love
Soundtrack Album of the Year	Soundtrack Single of the Year
Celine Dion - Titanic	Celine Dion - "My Heart Will Go On"
Album Artist of the Year	Adult Contemporary Artist of the Year
Celine Dion	Celine Dion
