= 1994 Billboard Music Awards =

American music award ceremony

- Location: Universal Amphitheatre, Universal City, California, U.S.
- Hosted by: Heather Locklear and Dennis Miller

Television/radio coverage
- Network: Fox

Finalists and winners at the 1994 Billboard Music Awards.

== Winners ==
#1 Female Country Artist	#1 Male Artist
Reba McEntire	Snoop Doggy Dogg
#1 Modern Rock Artist	Special Award for Artistic Excellence
Stone Temple Pilots	The Rolling Stones
#1 New Artist	#1 Single
Ace of Base	Ace of Base - The Sign
Century Award	#1 Album Rock Track
Billy Joel	Collective Soul - Shine
#1 Rap Artist	Special Award for Artistic Excellence
Da Brat	Eric Clapton
#1 Contemporary Jazz Artist	#1 Female Artist
Kenny G	Mariah Carey
#1 R&B Artist
R. Kelly
