= 1996 Billboard Music Awards =

American music award ceremony

- Location: Las Vegas, Nevada U.S.
- Hosted by: Chris Rock

Television/radio coverage
- Network: Fox

Finalists and winners at the 1996 Billboard Music Awards.

== Winners ==
Century Award	Rock Track of the Year
Carlos Santana	Dishwalla - Counting Blue Cars
Rap Artist of the Year	Single of the Year
L.L. Cool J	Los Del Rio - Macarena
Artist Achievement Award	Special Hot 100 Singles Award
Madonna	Mariah Carey and Boyz II Men - One Sweet Day
Hot 100 Singles Artist of the Year	R&B Artist of the Year
Mariah Carey	R. Kelly
New Artist of the Year	R&B Single of the Year
The Tony Rich Project	Toni Braxton - You're Makin' Me High/Let It Flow
Artist of the Year	Country Single of the Year
Alanis Morissette	Brooks & Dunn - My Maria
