= Billboard Music Award for Top Artist =

Annual American music award

Billboard Music Awards for Top Artist
- Country: United States
- Presented by: Billboard
- First award: 1993
- Currently held by: Taylor Swift (2024)

Highlights
- Most wins: Taylor Swift (4)
- Most nominations: Taylor Swift (10)
- Website: billboardmusicawards.com

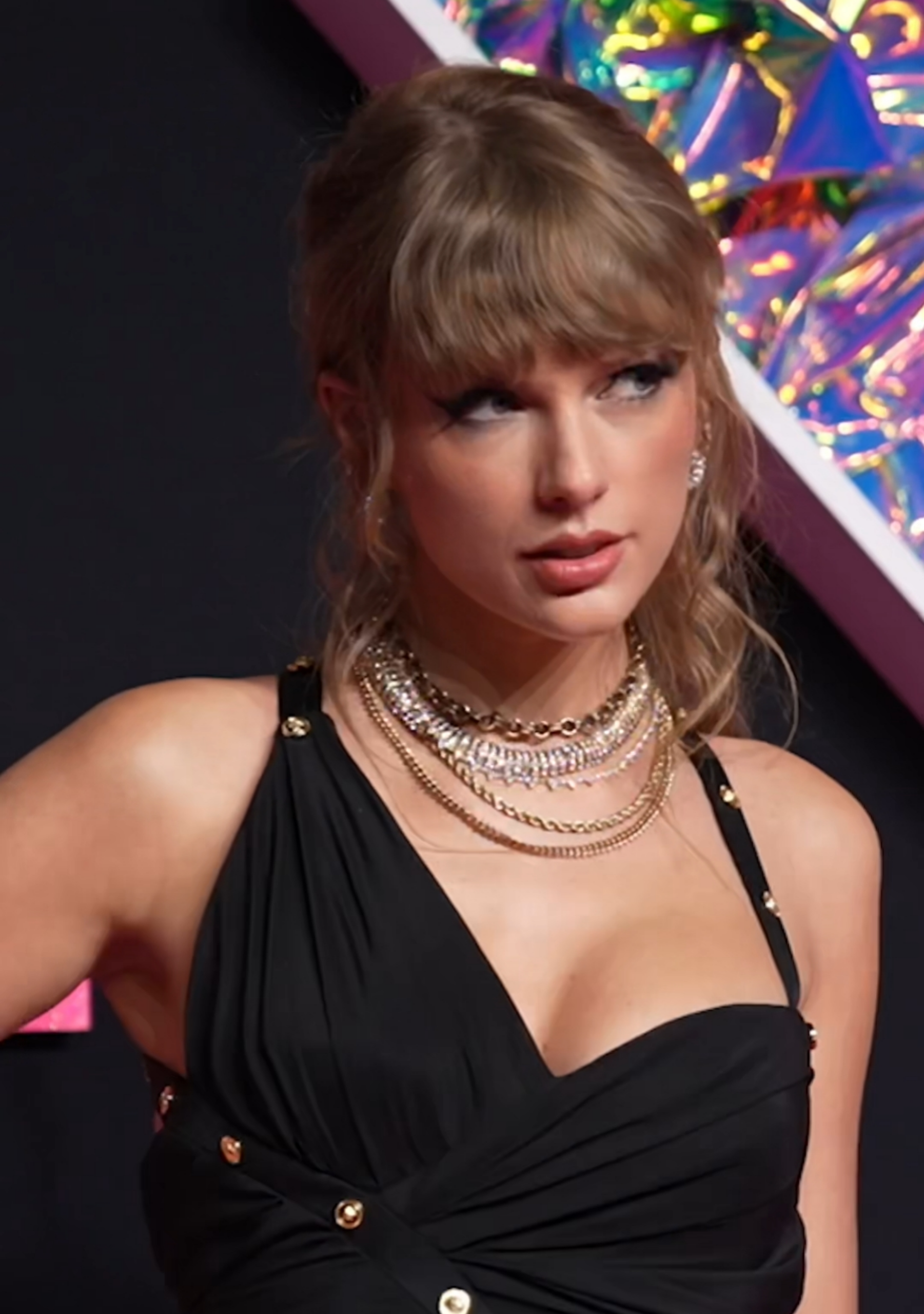

This article lists the winners and nominees for the Billboard Music Award for Top Artist. The award was first given in 1993, entitled #1 World Artist. It was retired during the 1994 ceremony, but returned the following year under the title Artist of the Year. It was later renamed to its current title in 2011. Taylor Swift is the artist with the most win in this category, won the award four times. Swift is also the most nominated artist in this category with ten nominations.

== Winners and nominees ==
Winners are listed first and highlighted in bold.

=== 1990s ===
Year	Artist	Ref.
1993	**Whitney Houston**	
1994	—N/a	
1995	**TLC**	
1995	Boyz II Men	
1995	Hootie & the Blowfish	
1995	Real McCoy	
1996	**Alanis Morissette**	
1996	Hootie & The Blowfish	
1996	Mariah Carey	
1996	Celine Dion	
1997	**LeAnn Rimes**	
1997	Toni Braxton	
1997	Jewel	
1997	Spice Girls	
1998	**Usher**	
1998	LeAnn Rimes	
1998	Savage Garden	
1998	Shania Twain	
1999	**Backstreet Boys**	
1999	Britney Spears	
1999	TLC	
1999	Shania Twain	

=== 2000s ===
Year	Artist	Ref.
2000	**Destiny's Child**	
2000	Santana	
2000	Christina Aguilera	
2000	NSYNC	
2001	**Destiny's Child**	
2001	Jennifer Lopez	
2001	Nelly	
2001	Shaggy	
2002	**Nelly**	
2002	Ashanti	
2002	Creed	
2002	Eminem	
2003	**50 Cent**	
2003	R. Kelly	
2003	Sean Paul	
2003	Justin Timberlake	
2004	**Usher**	
2004	Alicia Keys	
2004	Maroon 5	
2004	Outkast	
2005	**50 Cent**	
2005	Mariah Carey	
2005	Kelly Clarkson	
2005	Green Day	
2006	**Chris Brown**	
2006	Rascal Flatts	
2006	Nickelback	
2006	Sean Paul	
2007-2009	—N/a	

=== 2010s ===
Year	Artist	Ref.
2010	—N/a	
2011	**Eminem**	
2011	Justin Bieber	
2011	Lady Gaga	
2011	Rihanna	
2011	Taylor Swift	
2012	**Adele**	
2012	Lady Gaga	
2012	Lil Wayne	
2012	Katy Perry	
2012	Rihanna	
2013	**Taylor Swift**	
2013	Justin Bieber	
2013	Maroon 5	
2013	One Direction	
2013	Rihanna	
2014	**Justin Timberlake**	
2014	Miley Cyrus	
2014	Imagine Dragons	
2014	Bruno Mars	
2014	Katy Perry	
2015	**Taylor Swift**	
2015	Ariana Grande	
2015	Katy Perry	
2015	One Direction	
2015	Sam Smith	
2016	**Adele**	
2016	Justin Bieber	
2016	Drake	
2016	Taylor Swift	
2016	The Weeknd	
2017	**Drake**	
2017	Adele	
2017	Beyoncé	
2017	Justin Bieber	
2017	The Chainsmokers	
2017	Ariana Grande	
2017	Shawn Mendes	
2017	Rihanna	
2017	Twenty One Pilots	
2017	The Weeknd	
2018	**Ed Sheeran**	
2018	Drake	
2018	Kendrick Lamar	
2018	Bruno Mars	
2018	Taylor Swift	
2019	**Drake**	
2019	Cardi B	
2019	Ariana Grande	
2019	Post Malone	
2019	Travis Scott	

=== 2020s ===
Year	Artist	Ref.
2020	**Post Malone**	
2020	Billie Eilish	
2020	Jonas Brothers	
2020	Khalid	
2020	Taylor Swift	
2021	**The Weeknd**	
2021	Drake	
2021	Juice WRLD	
2021	Pop Smoke	
2021	Taylor Swift	
2022	**Drake**	
2022	Doja Cat	
2022	Olivia Rodrigo	
2022	Taylor Swift	
2022	The Weeknd	
2023	**Taylor Swift**	
2023	Drake	
2023	Luke Combs	
2023	SZA	
2023	Morgan Wallen	
2024	**Taylor Swift**	
2024	Zach Bryan	
2024	Sabrina Carpenter	
2024	Drake	
2024	Morgan Wallen	

== Multiple wins and nominations ==
=== Wins ===
4 wins

- Taylor Swift

3 wins

- Drake

2 wins

- 50 Cent
- Adele
- Destiny's Child
- Usher

=== Nominations ===
10 nominations

- Taylor Swift

7 nominations

- Drake

4 nominations

- Justin Bieber
- Rihanna
- The Weeknd

3 nominations

- Adele
- Katy Perry
- Ariana Grande

2 nominations

- TLC
- Hootie & the Blowfish
- 50 Cent
- Destiny's Child
- Eminem
- Lady Gaga
- LeAnn Rimes
- Maroon 5
- Mariah Carey
- Nelly
- One Direction
- Sean Paul
- Post Malone
- Justin Timberlake
- Usher
- Bruno Mars
- Morgan Wallen
