= 2000 Billboard Music Awards =

American music award ceremony

- Date: December 5, 2000
- Location: Las Vegas, Nevada, U.S.
- Hosted by: Kathy Griffin and NSYNC

Television/radio coverage
- Network: Fox

Finalists and winners at the 2000 Billboard Music Awards.

== Winners ==
Artist of the Year	New R&B/Hip-Hop Artist of the Year
Destiny's Child	Sisqo
R&B/Hip-Hop Singles Artist of the Year	Latin Tracks Artist of the Year
Sisqo	Son by Four
Latin Track of the Year	Latin Pop Track of the Year
Son by Four - A Puro Dolor	Son by Four - A Puro Dolar
Tropical/Salsa Track of the Year	Female R&B/Hip-Hop Artist
Son by Four - A Puro Dolar	Toni Braxton
Top 40 Track of the Year	Adult Top 40 Artist of the Year
Vertical Horizon - Everything You Want	Vertical Horizon
Hot 100 Songwriter of the Year	Male Artist of the Year
Rob Thomas	Sisqo
Duo/Group of the Year	New Artist of the Year
Destiny's Child	Sisqo
Hot 100 Singles Artist of the Year	Male Hot 100 Singles Artist of the Year
Destiny's Child	Sisqo
Hot 100 Singles Duo or Group of the Year	R&B/Hip-Hop Artist of the Year
Destiny's Child	Sisqo
Country Artist of the Year	Country Duo/Group of the Year
Dixie Chicks	Dixie Chicks
Country Album of the Year	Country Albums Artist of the Year
Dixie Chicks - Fly	Dixie Chicks
Hot 100 Single of the Year	Female Hot 100 Singles Artist
Faith Hill - Breathe	Faith Hill
Hot 100 Airplay Track of the Year	Female Country Artist of the Year
Faith Hill - Breathe	Faith Hill
R&B/Hip-Hop Airplay Track of the Year	New Female Artist of the Year
Joe - I Wanna Know	Pink
Century Award	Rock Artist of the Year
Randy Newman	Creed
Album of the Year	Albums Artist Duo/Group of the Year
NSYNC - No Strings Attached	NSYNC
Top 40 Artist of the Year	Special Award
NSYNC	NSYNC
Rock Track of the Year	Modern Rock Track of the Year
3 Doors Down - Kryptonite	3 Doors Down - Kryptonite
World Music Artist of the Year	World Music Album of the Year
Celine Dion - Baha Men	Baha Men - Who Let the Dogs Out
Albums Artist of the Year	Special Award
Britney Spears	Britney Spears
Female Artist of the Year
Christina Aguilera
