= 1997 Billboard Music Awards =

American music award ceremony

- Location: Las Vegas, Nevada, U.S.
- Hosted by: David Spade

Television/radio coverage
- Network: Fox

Finalists and winners at the 1997 Billboard Music Awards.

== Winners ==
Adult Contemporary Song	Rock Track
Toni Braxton - Un-break My Heart	Tonic - If You Could Only See
Adult Contemporary Artist	Rap Single
Toni Braxton	112, Puff Daddy and Faith Evans - I'll Be Missing You
Artist Achievement Award	Contemporary Jazz Artist
Garth Brooks	Kenny G
Country Artist	Country Albums Artist
LeAnn Rimes	LeAnn Rimes
Artist of the Year	Rock Artist
LeAnn Rimes	Metallica
Rap Artist	Rap Single
Puff Daddy	Puff Daddy - I'll Be Missing You featuring Faith Evans and 112
Album of the Year	New Artist
Spice Girls - Spice	Spice Girls
Special Billboard Award	Modern Rock Artist
Elton John - Candle in the Wind	Sublime
Single of the Year	R&B Album
Elton John - Candle in the Wind	The Notorious B.I.G. - Life After Death
Singles Artist	Modern Rock Track
Elton John	Third Eye Blind - Semi-Charmed Life
Singles Sales Artist	Female R&B Artist
Elton John	Toni Braxton
Rap Single	Century Award
Puff Daddy, Faith Evans and 112 - I'll Be Missing You	Chet Atkins
Songwriter of the Year	R&B Single
Diane Warren	Dru Hill - In My Bed
R&B Artist	R&B Singles Artist
Dru Hill	Dru Hill
