= 2005 Billboard Music Awards =

Annual American music awards ceremony

- Date: December 6, 2005
- Location: MGM Grand Garden Arena, Las Vegas, Nevada, U.S.
- Hosted by: LL Cool J

Highlights
- Most awards: 50 Cent (6); Green Day (6)
- Most nominations: 50 Cent (15)
- Website: http://www.billboard.com/bbma/

Television/radio coverage
- Network: FOX

The 2005 Billboard Music Awards were held December 6, 2005 at the MGM Grand Garden Arena in Las Vegas, Nevada. The awards recognized the most popular artists and albums from 2005. Green Day and 50 Cent dominated the awards this year, with both winning 6 awards each.

== Performances ==
Artist(s)	Song(s)
Green Day	"Holiday"
Ciara	"Goodies" "1,2 Step"
Toby Keith	"Get Drunk and Be Somebody"
Ashlee Simpson; Pretty Ricky	"Grind with Me" "L.O.V.E."
Gwen Stefani; Slim Thug	"Luxurious"
R. Kelly	"Slow Wind"
Pharrell Williams; Daddy Yankee	"Rompe" "Mamacita"
Carrie Underwood	"Some Hearts"
R.Kelly	"Let Your Light Shine"

== Winners and nominees ==
Winners are listed first and in bold.

Artist of the Year	New Artist of the Year
**50 Cent**; Mariah Carey; Kelly Clarkson; Green Day	**Gwen Stefani**; Fantasia; The Game; Rob Thomas
Female Billboard 200 Album Artist of the Year	Billboard 200 Album Group of the Year
**Mariah Carey**; Kelly Clarkson; Gwen Stefani; Shania Twain	**Green Day**; The Black Eyed Peas; Destiny's Child; U2
Pop Group of the Year	
**Green Day**	
Album of the Year	Hot 100 Artist of the Year
**The Massacre – 50 Cent**; The Emancipation of Mimi – Mariah Carey; Encore – Eminem; American Idiot – Green Day	**50 Cent**; The Game; Ludacris; Mario
Hot 100 Group of the Year	Hot 100 Song of the Year
**Green Day**; The Black Eyed Peas; Destiny's Child; The Killers	**"We Belong Together" – Mariah Carey**; "Since U Been Gone" – Kelly Clarkson; "Let Me Love You" – Mario; "Hollaback Girl" – Gwen Stefani
Hot 100 Airplay of the Year	Top-Selling Hot 100 Song of the Year
**"We Belong Together" – Mariah Carey**; "1, 2 Step" – Ciara featuring Missy Elliott; "Since U Been Gone" – Kelly Clarkson; "Let Me Love You" – Mario	**"Inside Your Heaven / Independence Day" – Carrie Underwood**; "When You Tell Me That You Love Me" – American Idol Season 4 Finalists; "Inside Your Heaven / Vehicle" – Bo Bice; "Don't Cha" – The Pussycat Dolls featuring Busta Rhymes
Digital Song of the Year	Ringtone of the Year
**"Hollaback Girl" – Gwen Stefani**; "Since U Been Gone" – Kelly Clarkson; "Boulevard of Broken Dreams" – Green Day; "Mr. Brightside" – The Killers	**"Candy Shop" – 50 Cent featuring Olivia**; "1, 2 Step" – Ciara featuring Missy Elliott; "Lovers & Friends" – Lil Jon & The East Side Boyz featuring Usher and Ludacris; "Drop It Like It's Hot" – Snoop Dogg featuring Pharrell
R&B/Hip-Hop Artist of the Year	Female R&B/Hip-Hop Artist of the Year
**50 Cent**; Mariah Carey; Destiny's Child; Fantasia	**Mariah Carey**; Ciara; Fantasia; Alicia Keys
R&B/Hip-Hop Group of the Year	Rap Single of the Year
**Destiny's Child**; The Black Eyed Peas; Lil Jon & The East Side Boyz; Ying Yang Twins	**"Lovers & Friends" – Lil Jon & The East Side Boyz featuring Usher and Ludacris**; "Candy Shop" – 50 Cent featuring Olivia; "How We Do" – The Game featuring 50 Cent; "Drop It Like It's Hot" – Snoop Dogg featuring Pharrell
R&B/Hip-Hop Song of the Year	R&B/Hip-Hop Airplay Song of the Year
**"Let Me Love You" – Mario**; "We Belong Together" – Mariah Carey; "Truth Is" – Fantasia; "Lovers & Friends" – Lil Jon & The East Side Boyz featuring Usher and Ludacris	**"Let Me Love You" – Mario**; "We Belong Together" – Mariah Carey; "Truth Is" – Fantasia; "Lovers & Friends" – Lil Jon & The East Side Boyz featuring Usher and Ludacris
Rhythmic Top 40 Title of the Year	Rap Artist of the Year
**"We Belong Together" – Mariah Carey**; "Candy Shop" – 50 Cent featuring Olivia; "Just a Lil Bit" – 50 Cent; "Let Me Love You" – Mario	**50 Cent**; The Game; Ludacris; T.I.
Country Artist of the Year	Country Songs Artist of the Year
**Toby Keith**; Kenny Chesney; Rascal Flatts; Gretchen Wilson	**Rascal Flatts**; Kenny Chesney; Sugarland; Keith Urban
Country Album Artist of the Year	Country Album of the Year
**Toby Keith**; Kenny Chesney; Shania Twain; Gretchen Wilson	**Greatest Hits – Shania Twain**; Feels Like Today – Kenny Chesney; Greatest Hits 2 – Toby Keith; Here for the Party – Gretchen Wilson
Country Single Sales Artist of the Year	Top-Selling Country Single of the Year
**Carrie Underwood**	**"Inside Your Heaven / Independence Day" – Carrie Underwood**
Rock Artist of the Year	Rock Single of the Year
**Green Day**; Breaking Benjamin; Papa Roach; Velvet Revolver	**"Boulevard of Broken Dreams" – Green Day**; "Best of You" – Foo Fighters; "Feel Good Inc." – Gorillaz; "The Hand that Feeds" – Nine Inch Nails
Modern Rock Artist of the Year	Latin Album Artist of the Year
**Green Day**; Foo Fighters; The Killers; Nine Inch Nails	**Daddy Yankee**; Juanes; Shakira; Los Temerarios
Latin Album of the Year	Latin Single of the Year
**Barrio Fino – Daddy Yankee**; Mi Sangre – Juanes; Fijación Oral Vol. 1 – Shakira; Chosen Few: El Documental – Boy Wonder "Chosen Few" & Various Artists	**"La Tortura" – Shakira featuring Alejandro Sanz**; "Hoy Como Ayer" – Conjunto Primavera; "Lo Que Pasó, Pasó" – Daddy Yankee; "La Camisa Negra" – Juanes
Latin Pop Album Artist of the Year	Latin Pop Album of the Year
**Shakira**; Juanes; RBD; Marco Antonio Solís	**Fijación Oral Vol. 1 – Shakira**; Cautivo – Chayanne; Nuestro Amor – RBD; Rebelde – RBD
Comedy Artist of the Year	Comedy Album of the Year
**Larry the Cable Guy**; Dane Cook; Jeff Foxworthy; Stephen Lynch	**The Right to Bare Arms – Larry the Cable Guy**; Retaliation – Dane Cook; Blue Collar Comedy Tour: The Movie – Various Artists; Blue Collar Comedy Tour Rides Again – Various Artists
Artist Achievement Award	Billboard Century Award
Kanye West	Tom Petty
