= Billboard Music Award for Top New Artist =

Annual American music award

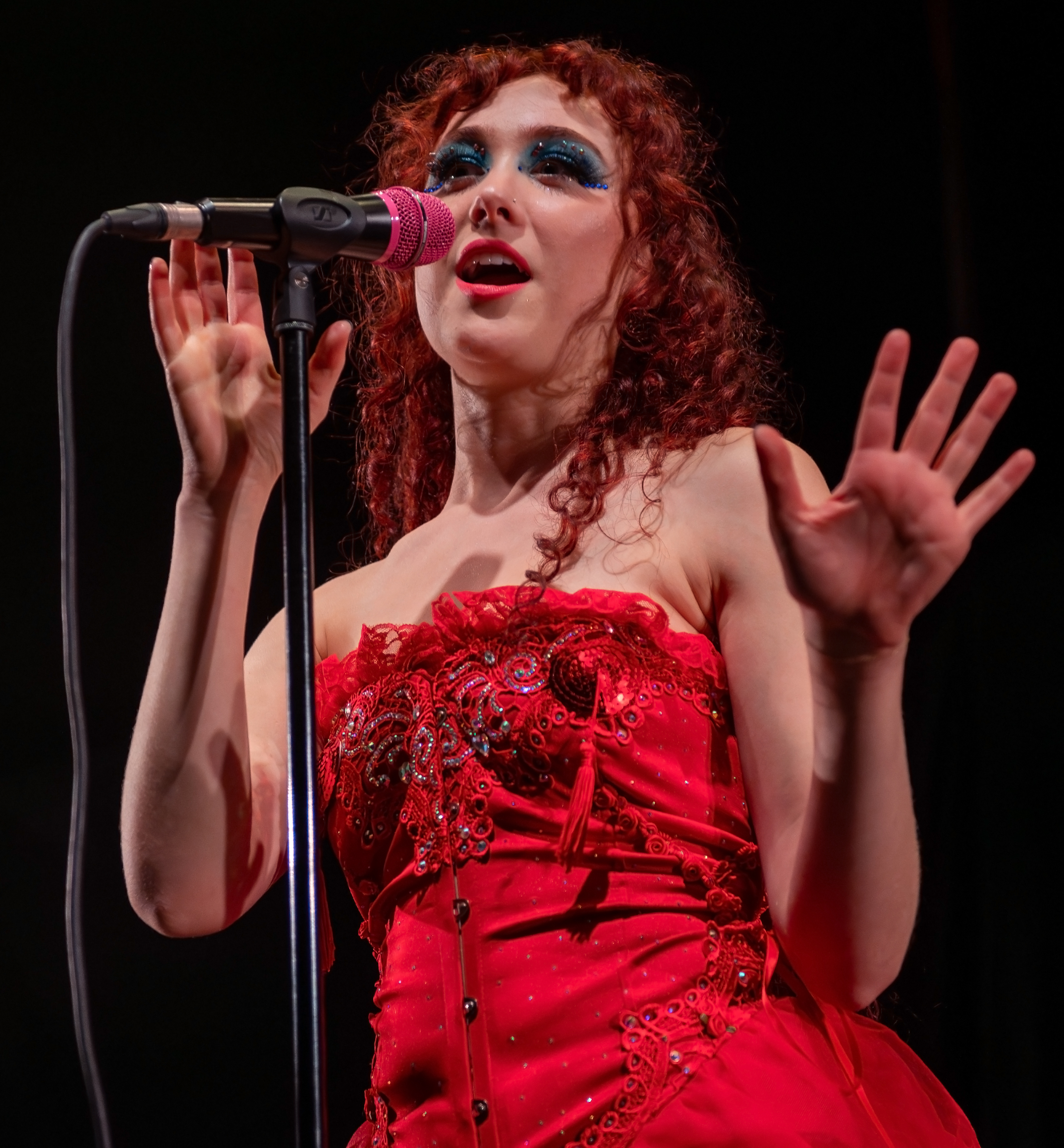
Chappell Roan, winner of Top New Artist in 2024

This article lists the winners and nominees for the Billboard Music Award for Top New Artist. From 2000 to 2004, the award was split into solo gender categories as New Male Artist of the Year and New Female Artist of the Year.

Zayn Malik is the only artist to have received the award twice, winning in 2013 as a member of One Direction and again in 2017 as a solo artist.

== Winners and nominees ==
Winners are listed first and highlighted in bold.

=== 1990s ===
Year	Artist	Ref.
1994	**Ace of Base**	
1994	Tim McGraw	
1994	Counting Crowns	
1994	Snoop Doggy Dog	
1994	All-4-One	
1995	**Real McCoy**	
1996	**Tony Rich**	
1996	No Doubt	
1996	La Bouche	
1997	**Spice Girls**	
1997	Dru Hill	
1997	Hanson	
1997	Puff Daddy	
1998	**Next**	
1998	Marcy Playground	
1998	'N Sync	
1998	Jennifer Paige	
1999	**Britney Spears**	
1999	Christina Aguilera	
1999	Lou Bega	
1999	Jennifer Lopez	

=== 2000s ===
Year	Artist	Ref.
2000	**Sisqó** (Billboard Music Award for Male New Artist of the Year) (Note: From 2000 to 2004, the award was split into solo gender categories as New Male Artist of the Year and New Female Artist of the Year.)	
2000	**Pink** (Billboard Music Award for Female New Artist of the Year)	
2001	**Lifehouse** (Billboard Music Award for Male New Artist of the Year)	
2001	**Alicia Keys** (Billboard Music Award for Female New Artist of the Year)	
2002-03	—N/a	
2004	**Kanye West** (Billboard Music Award for Male New Artist of the Year)	
2004	J-Kwon	
2004	Ruben Studdard	
2004	Mario Winans	
2004	**Ashlee Simpson** (Billboard Music Award for Female New Artist of the Year)	
2004	Gretchen Wilson	
2004	JoJo	
2004	Ciara	
2005	**Gwen Stefani**	
2005	Fantasia	
2005	The Game	
2005	Rob Thomas	
2006	**Chris Brown**	
2006	James Blunt	
2006	The Fray	
2006	Ne-Yo	
2007-09	—N/a	

=== 2010s ===
Year	Artist	Ref.
2010	—N/a	
2011	**Justin Bieber**	
2011	Taio Cruz	
2011	Kesha	
2011	Bruno Mars	
2011	Nicki Minaj	
2012	**Wiz Khalifa**	
2012	Big Sean	
2012	Bad Meets Evil	
2012	Foster the People	
2012	Scotty McCreery	
2013	**One Direction**	
2013	Gotye	
2013	Carly Rae Jepsen	
2013	The Lumineers	
2013	Psy	
2014	**Lorde**	
2014	Bastille	
2014	Capital Cities	
2014	Ariana Grande	
2014	Passenger	
2015	**Sam Smith**	
2015	5 Seconds of Summer	
2015	Iggy Azalea	
2015	Hozier	
2015	Meghan Trainor	
2016	**Fetty Wap**	
2016	Omi	
2016	Charlie Puth	
2016	Silentó	
2016	Bryson Tiller	
2017	**Zayn Malik**	
2017	Alessia Cara	
2017	Desiigner	
2017	Lukas Graham	
2017	Lil Uzi Vert	
2018	**Khalid**	
2018	21 Savage	
2018	Camila Cabello	
2018	Cardi B	
2018	Kodak Black	
2019	**Juice WRLD**	
2019	Bazzi	
2019	Dua Lipa	
2019	Ella Mai	
2019	Lil Baby	

=== 2020s ===
Year	Artist	Ref.
2020	**Billie Eilish**	
2020	DaBaby	
2020	Lil Nas X	
2020	Lizzo	
2020	Roddy Ricch	
2021	**Pop Smoke**	
2021	Gabby Barrett	
2021	Doja Cat	
2021	Jack Harlow	
2021	Rod Wave	
2022	**Olivia Rodrigo**	
2022	Giveon	
2022	Masked Wolf	
2022	Pooh Shiesty	
2022	The Kid Laroi	
2023	**Zach Bryan**	
2023	Ice Spice	
2023	Jelly Roll	
2023	Peso Pluma	
2023	Bailey Zimmerman	
2024	**Chappell Roan**	
2024	Benson Boone	
2024	Tommy Richman	
2024	Shaboozey	
2024	Teddy Swims	
