= Billboard Music Awards =

Awards for popular music

- Current: 2024 Billboard Music Awards
- Awarded for: Outstanding chart performance
- Country: United States
- Presented by: Billboard
- First award: December 10, 1990
- Website: www.billboardmusicawards.com

Television/radio coverage
- Network: Fox (1990–2006, 2024); ABC (2011–2017); NBC (2018–2022)

Most recent Billboard Music Award winners
- December 12, 2024
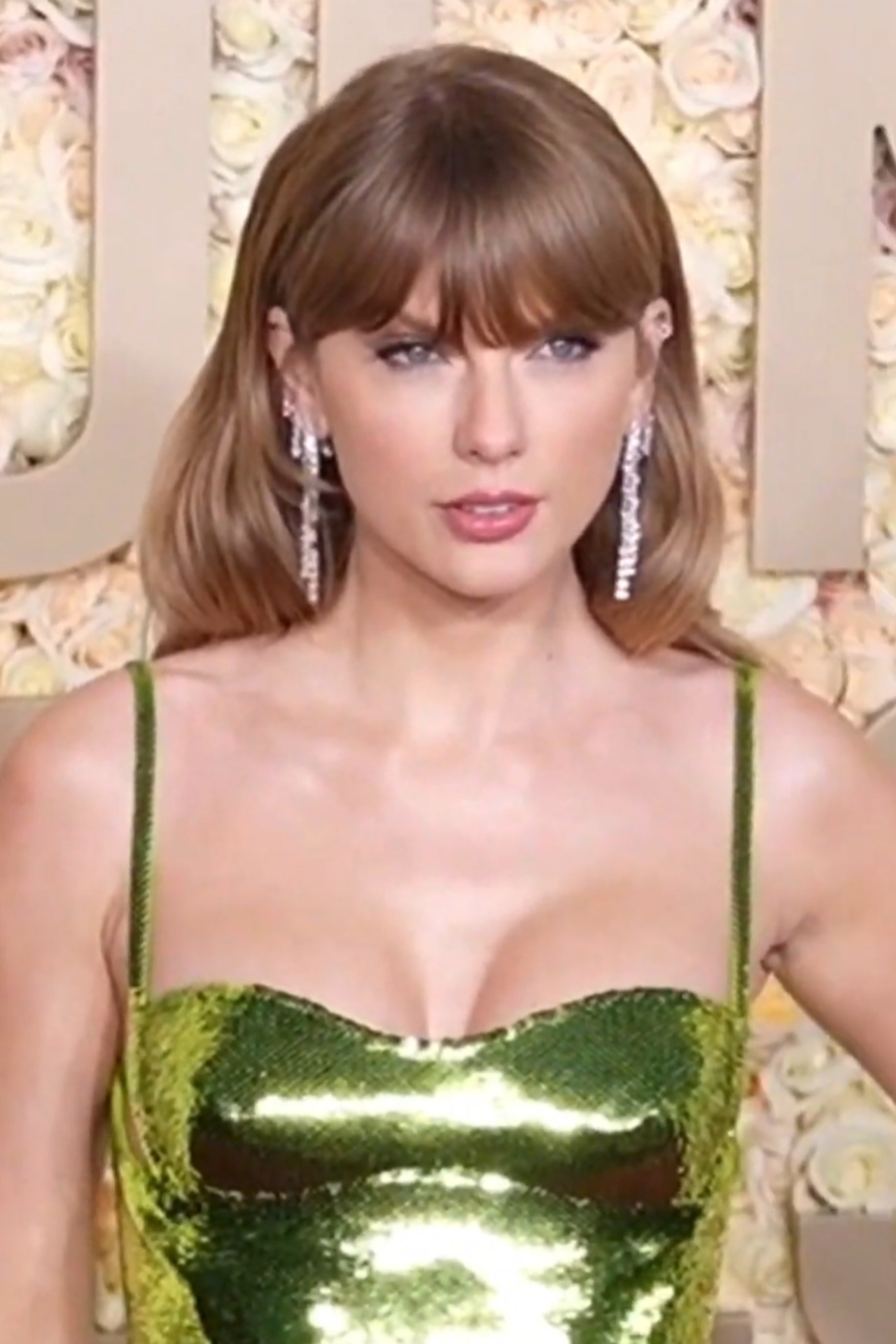

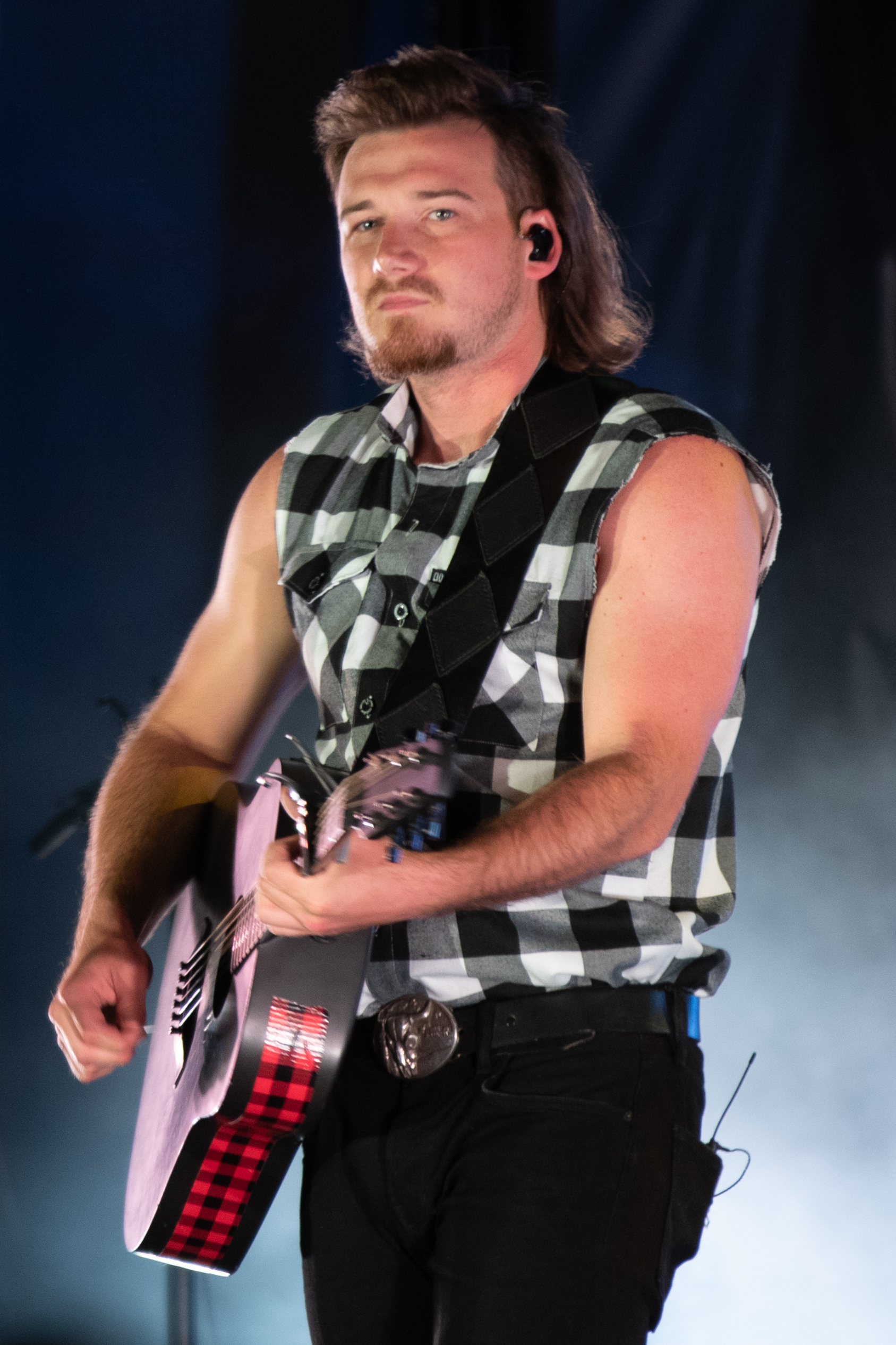

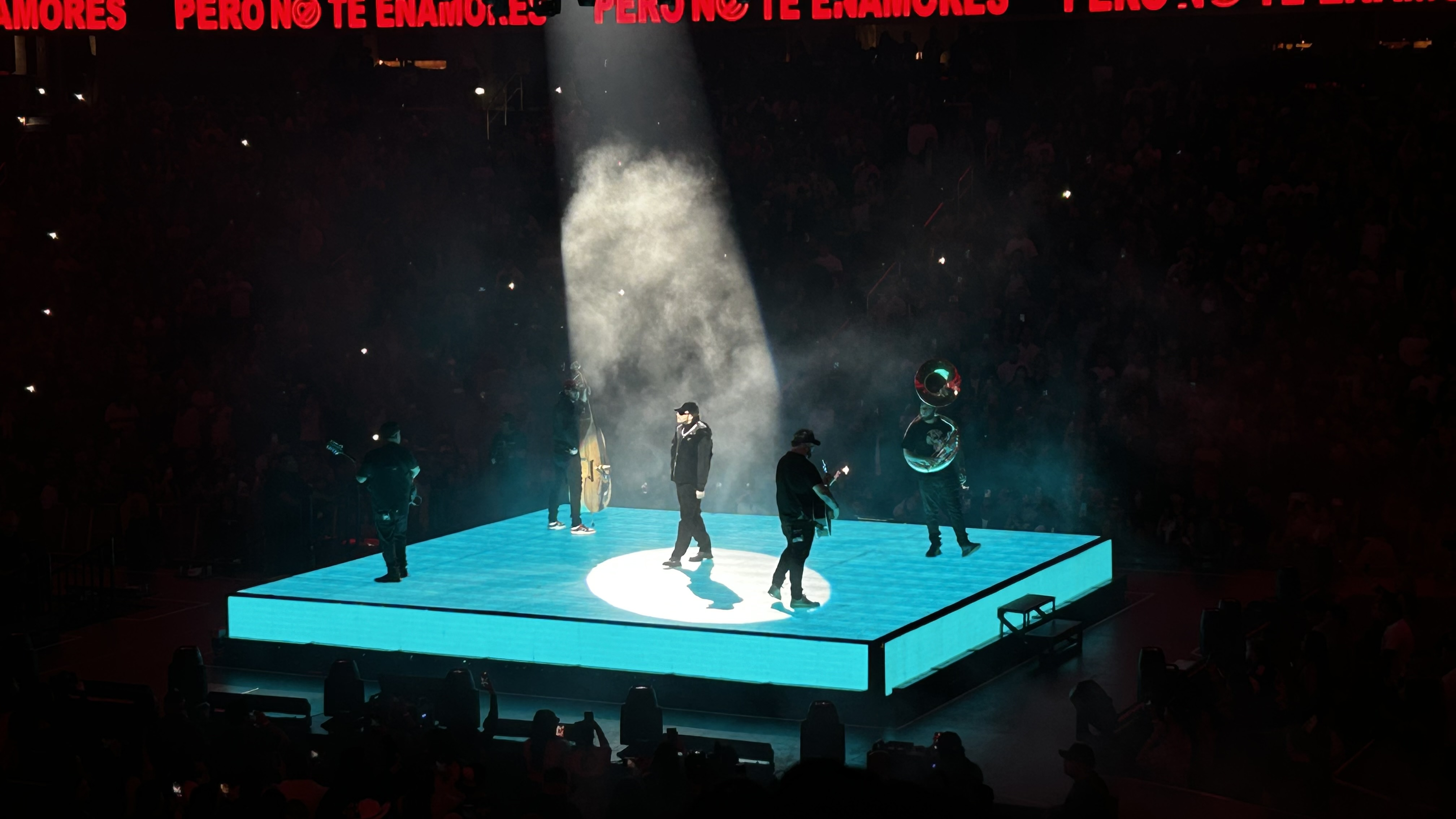

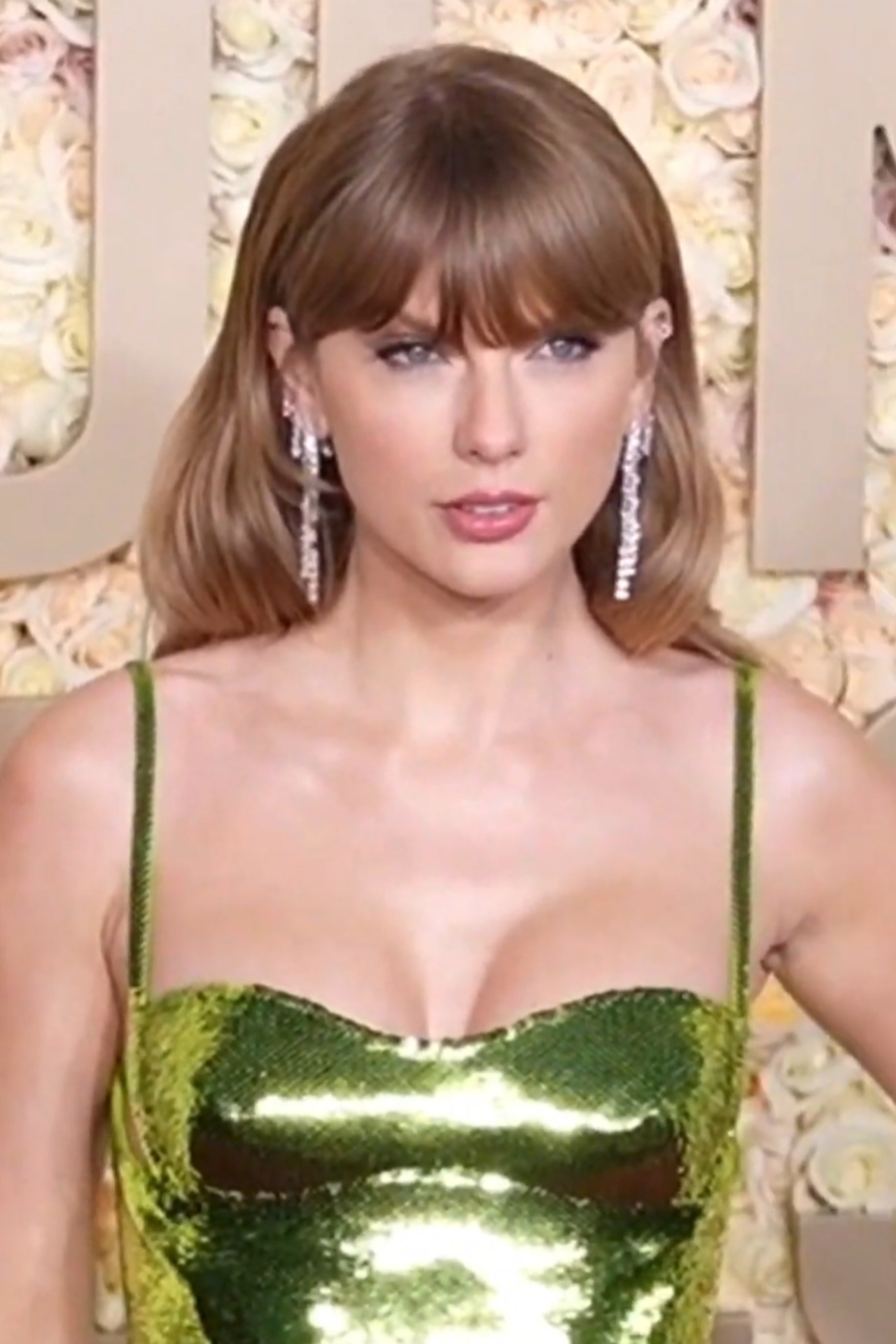

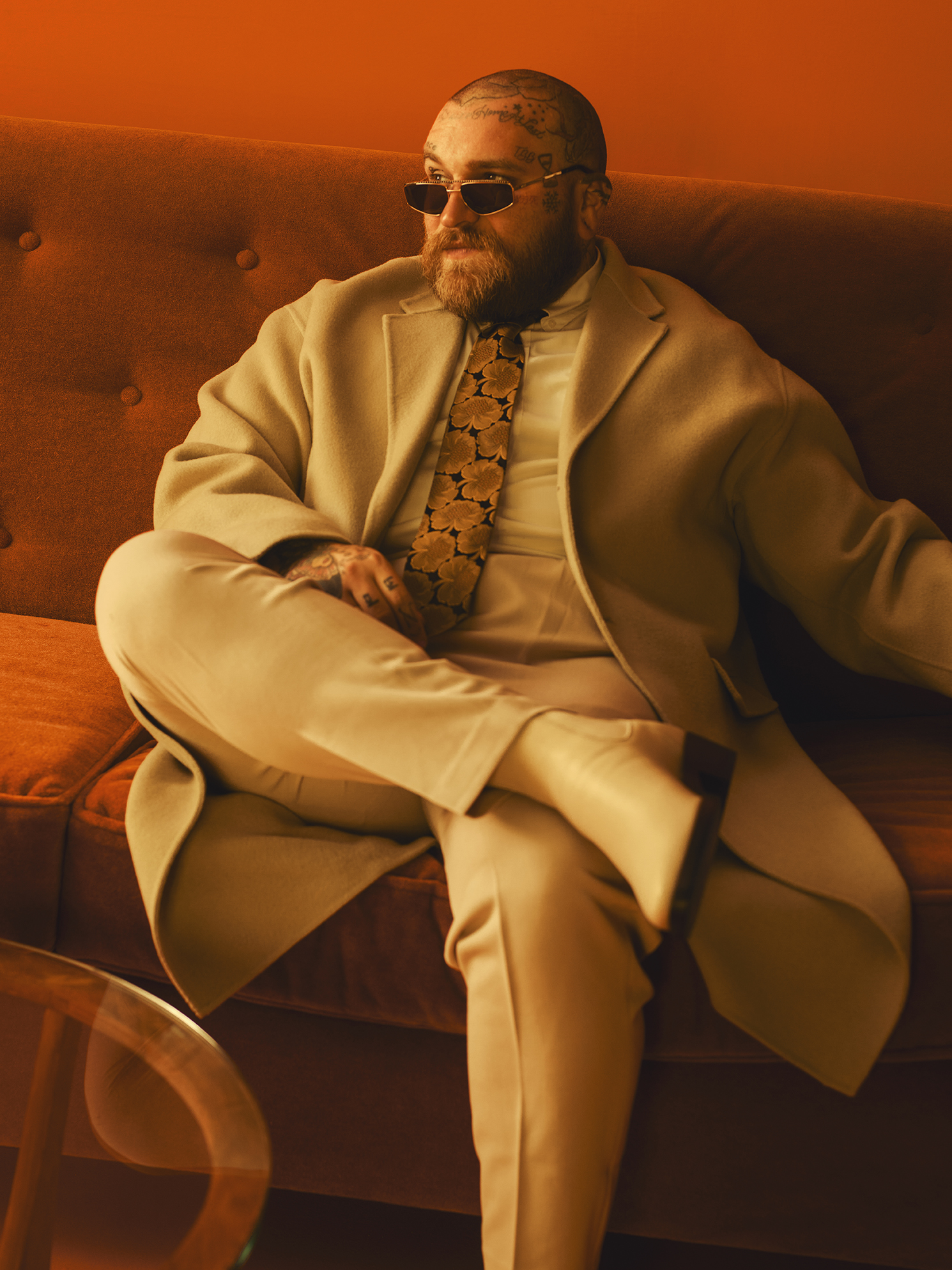

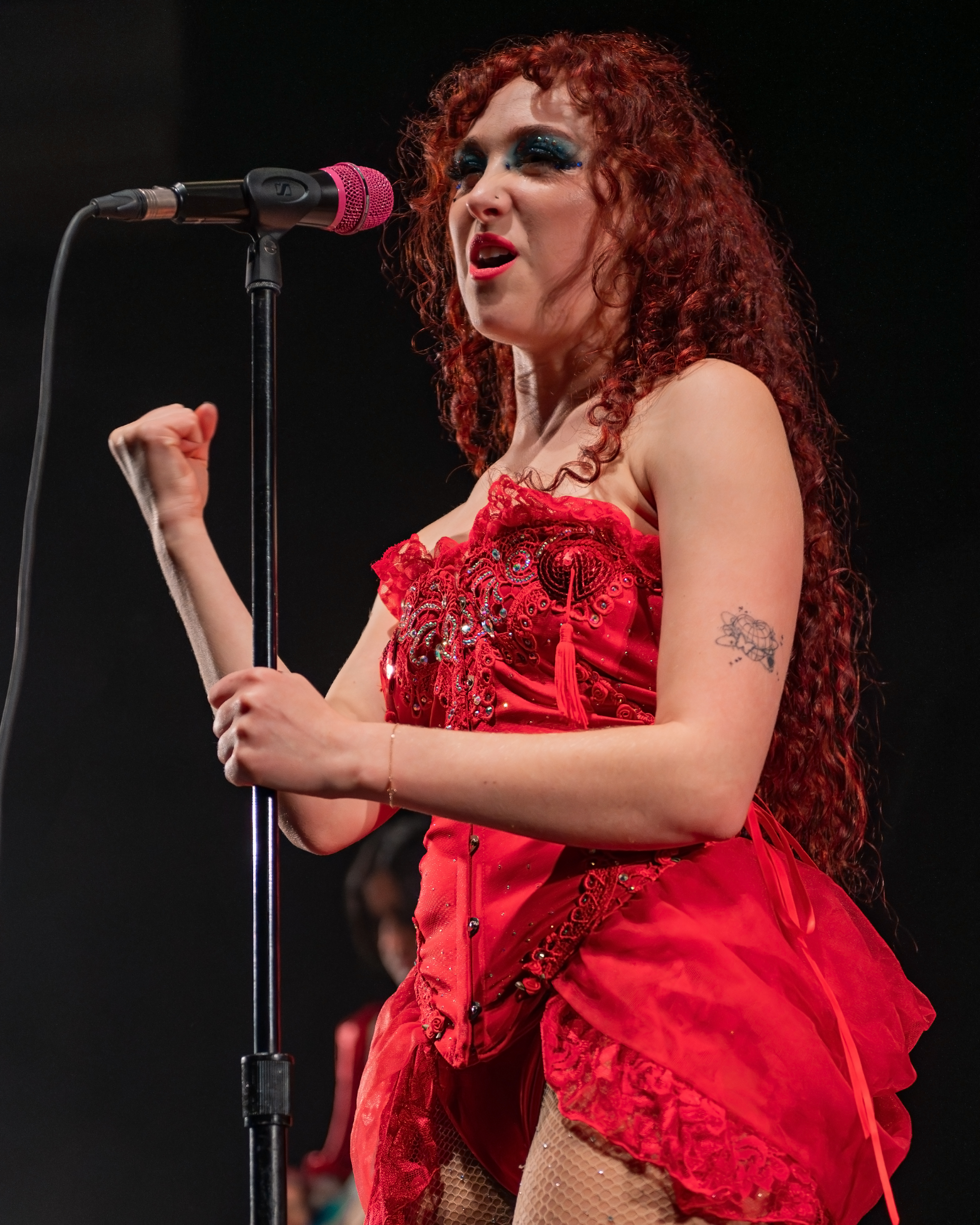
| Award | Top Artist & Top Female Artist, Top Billboard 200 Album & Top Hot 100 Artist | Top Male Artist, | Top Duo/Group |
| Winner | Taylor Swift | Morgan Wallen | Fuerza Regida |
| Award | Top Billboard 200 Artist | Top Hot 100 Song | Top New Artist |
| Winner | Taylor Swift | Teddy Swims ("Lose Control") | Chappell Roan |
Previous Top Artist
Taylor Swift
Top Artist
Taylor Swift

The Billboard Music Awards are honors given out annually by Billboard, a publication covering the music business and a music popularity chart. The Billboard Music Awards show has been held annually since 1990, with the exception of the years 2007 through 2010. The event was previously staged in December, but has been held in May since returning in 2011. On October 19, 2023, it was announced that the award ceremony will be reformatted as a digital-only show and move from broadcast television to its website and Billboard's social media pages, starting with the 2023 edition on November 19, but in 2024, the show aired on Fox.

== Awards process ==
Unlike other awards, such as the Grammy Award, which determine nominations as a result of the highest votes received by the National Academy of Recording Arts and Sciences, the Billboard Music Awards finalists are based on album and digital songs sales, streaming, radio airplay, touring, and social engagement. These measurements are tracked year-round by Billboard and its data partners, including MRC Data and Next Big Sound. The 2018 awards were based on the reporting period of April 8, 2017 through March 31, 2018. Awards are given for the top album, artist and single in a number of different music genres.

== Awards ==
| Year | Order | Date | Venue | City | Host(s) | TV network | Ref. |
|---|---|---|---|---|---|---|---|
| 1990 | 1 | December 10 | Barker Hangar | Santa Monica | Paul Shaffer & Morris Day with Jerome Benton | Fox | |
| 1991 | 2 | December 9 | Barker Hangar | Santa Monica | Paul Shaffer | Fox | |
| 1992 | 3 | December 8 | Universal Amphitheater | Los Angeles | Phil Collins | Fox | |
| 1993 | 4 | December 8 | Universal Amphitheater | Los Angeles | Phil Collins | Fox | |
| 1994 | 5 | December 7 | Universal Amphitheater | Los Angeles | Dennis Miller and Heather Locklear | Fox | |
| 1995 | 6 | December 6 | New York Coliseum | New York City | Jon Stewart | Fox | |
| 1996 | 7 | December 4 | Hard Rock Hotel | Las Vegas | Chris Rock | Fox | |
| 1997 | 8 | December 8 | MGM Grand Garden Arena | Las Vegas | David Spade | Fox | |
| 1998 | 9 | December 7 | MGM Grand Garden Arena | Las Vegas | Kathy Griffin and Andy Dick | Fox | |
| 1999 | 10 | December 8 | MGM Grand Garden Arena | Las Vegas | Kathy Griffin and Adam Carolla | Fox | |
| 2000 | 11 | December 5 | MGM Grand Garden Arena | Las Vegas | Kathy Griffin and NSYNC | Fox | |
| 2001 | 12 | December 4 | MGM Grand Garden Arena | Las Vegas | Bernie Mac | Fox | |
| 2002 | 13 | December 9 | MGM Grand Garden Arena | Las Vegas | Cedric the Entertainer | Fox | |
| 2003 | 14 | December 10 | MGM Grand Garden Arena | Las Vegas | Ryan Seacrest with Nick Lachey and Jessica Simpson | Fox | |
| 2004 | 15 | December 8 | MGM Grand Garden Arena | Las Vegas | Ryan Seacrest | Fox | |
| 2005 | 16 | December 6 | MGM Grand Garden Arena | Las Vegas | LL Cool J | Fox | |
| 2006 | 17 | December 4 | MGM Grand Garden Arena | Las Vegas | — | Fox | |
Not held in 2007–2010
| 2011 | 18 | May 22 | MGM Grand Garden Arena | Las Vegas | Ken Jeong | ABC | |
| 2012 | 19 | May 20 | MGM Grand Garden Arena | Las Vegas | Julie Bowen and Ty Burrell | ABC | |
| 2013 | 20 | May 19 | MGM Grand Garden Arena | Las Vegas | Tracy Morgan | ABC | |
| 2014 | 21 | May 18 | MGM Grand Garden Arena | Las Vegas | Ludacris | ABC | |
| 2015 | 22 | May 17 | MGM Grand Garden Arena | Las Vegas | Ludacris and Chrissy Teigen | ABC | |
| 2016 | 23 | May 22 | T-Mobile Arena | Las Vegas | Ludacris and Ciara | ABC | |
| 2017 | 24 | May 21 | T-Mobile Arena | Las Vegas | Ludacris and Vanessa Hudgens | ABC | |
| 2018 | 25 | May 20 | MGM Grand Garden Arena | Las Vegas | Kelly Clarkson | NBC | |
| 2019 | 26 | May 1 | MGM Grand Garden Arena | Las Vegas | Kelly Clarkson | NBC | |
| 2020 | 27 | October 14 | Dolby Theatre | Los Angeles | Kelly Clarkson | NBC | |
| 2021 | 28 | May 23 | Microsoft Theater | Los Angeles | Nick Jonas | NBC | |
| 2022 | 29 | May 15 | MGM Grand Garden Arena | Las Vegas | Sean "Diddy" Combs | NBC | |
| 2023 | 30 | November 19 | —N/a | —N/a | —N/a | —N/a | |
| 2024 | 31 | December 12 | —N/a | —N/a | Michelle Buteau | Fox | |

== Categories ==
From 1990 to 2006, the show had the same categories and category names every year. In 2011, for the first time, all of the awards were renamed to "Top [award title]". The "of the year" portion of each category title no longer exists, and many of the awards have been further renamed. Other awards, including both "crossover" awards (No. 1 Classical Crossover Artist and No. 1 Classical Crossover Album) were discontinued. As of 2024, there are three fan-voted categories.

=== Current categories ===
The general categories are Top Artist, Top Billboard 200 Album, Top Hot 100 Song and Top New Artist. These categories highlighted in each award and other categories are divided by genre.

=== General ===
- Top Artist
- Top New Artist
- Top Male Artist
- Top Female Artist
- Top Duo/Group
- Top Billboard 200 Artist
- Top Billboard 200 Album
- Top Hot 100 Artist
- Top Hot 100 Song
- Top Hot 100 Songwriter
- Top Hot 100 Producer
- Top Billboard Global 200 Artist
- Top Billboard Global (Excluding U.S.) Artist
- Top Billboard Global 200 Song
- Top Billboard Global (Excluding U.S.) Song
- Top Touring Artist
- Top Song Sales Artist (since 2016)
- Top Selling Album (since 2018)
- Top Selling Song (since 2016)
- Top Radio Songs Artist
- Top Radio Song
- Top Streaming Songs Artist
- Top Streaming Song (Audio)
- Top Streaming Song (Video)

=== R&B ===
- Top R&B Artist
- Top R&B Male Artist (since 2018)
- Top R&B Female Artist (since 2018)
- Top R&B Album
- Top R&B Song
- Top R&B Tour (since 2017)

=== Rap ===
- Top Rap Artist
- Top Rap Male Artist (since 2018)
- Top Rap Female Artist (since 2018)
- Top Rap Album
- Top Rap Song
- Top Rap Tour (since 2017)

=== Country ===
- Top Country Artist
- Top Country Male Artist (since 2018)
- Top Country Female Artist (since 2018)
- Top Country Duo/Group Artist (since 2018)
- Top Country Album
- Top Country Song
- Top Country Tour (since 2017)

=== Rock ===
- Top Rock Artist
- Top Rock Album
- Top Rock Song
- Top Rock Tour (since 2017)

=== Latin ===
- Top Latin Artist
- Top Latin Male Artist (since 2021)
- Top Latin Female Artist (since 2021)
- Top Latin Duo/Group (since 2021)
- Top Latin Album
- Top Latin Song
- Top Latin Touring Artist (since 2022)

=== K-Pop ===
- Top Global K-Pop Artist (since 2023)
- Top Global K-Pop Song (since 2023)
- Top K-Pop Album (since 2023)
- Top K-Pop Touring Artist (since 2023)

=== Dance/Electronic ===
- Top Dance/Electronic Artist (since 2014)
- Top Dance/Electronic Album (since 2014)
- Top Dance/Electronic Song (since 2014)

=== Christian ===
- Top Christian Artist
- Top Christian Album
- Top Christian Song

=== Gospel ===
- Top Gospel Artist (since 2016)
- Top Gospel Album (since 2016)
- Top Gospel Song (since 2016)

=== Others genres ===
- Top Soundtrack (1993, 1998, 2000, 2006, 2015 – present)
- Top Social Artist (fan-voted)
- Billboard Chart Achievement (since 2015, fan-voted)
- Top Collaboration (since 2017, fan-voted)

=== Retired categories (1990–2022) ===
- Top Alternative Album
- Top Alternative Artist
- Top Alternative Song
- Top Classical Crossover Artist
- Top Classical Crossover Album
- Top Country Collaboration (2017)
- Top Dance Artist (until 2013)
- Top Dance Album (until 2013)
- Top Dance Song (until 2013)
- Top Digital Media Artist (until 2012)
- Top Digital Songs Artist (until 2015)
- Top Digital Song (until 2015)
- Top EDM Artist (until 2013)
- Top EDM Album (until 2013)
- Top EDM Song (until 2013)
- Top Independent Artists
- Top Independent Album
- Top Modern Rock Artist
- Top Modern Rock Track
- Top New Male Artist
- Top New Female Artist
- Top New Group/Band
- Top New Song
- Top Pop Song (until 2013)
- Top Pop Album (until 2013)
- Top Pop Artist (until 2013)
- Top Pop Punk Artist
- Top R&B Collaboration (2017)
- Top Rap Collaboration (2017)
- Top Rhythmic Top 40 Title
- Top Selling Single
- Top Soundtrack Single of the Year
- Milestone Award (2013, 2014)

=== Special awards ===
==== Artist Achievement Award ====
- 1993: Rod Stewart
- 1994: Whitney Houston
- 1995: Janet Jackson
- 1996: Madonna
- 1997: Garth Brooks
- 1999: Aerosmith
- 2001: Janet Jackson
- 2002: Cher
- 2004: Destiny's Child
- 2005: Kanye West

==== Artist of the Decade Award ====
- 1980s: Madonna
- 1990s: Mariah Carey
- 2000s: Eminem
- 2010s: Drake

==== Millennium Award ====
- 2011: Beyoncé
- 2012: Whitney Houston (award accepted by her daughter, Bobbi Kristina Brown)
- 2016: Britney Spears

==== Century Award ====
- 1992: George Harrison
- 1993: Buddy Guy
- 1994: Billy Joel
- 1995: Joni Mitchell
- 1996: Carlos Santana
- 1997: Chet Atkins
- 1998: James Taylor
- 1999: Emmylou Harris
- 2000: Randy Newman
- 2001: John Mellencamp
- 2002: Annie Lennox
- 2003: Sting
- 2004: Stevie Wonder
- 2005: Tom Petty
- 2006: Tony Bennett

==== Icon Award ====
- 2011: Neil Diamond
- 2012: Stevie Wonder
- 2013: Prince
- 2014: Jennifer Lopez
- 2016: Celine Dion
- 2017: Cher
- 2018: Janet Jackson
- 2019: Mariah Carey
- 2020: Garth Brooks
- 2021: P!nk
- 2022: Mary J. Blige

==== Spotlight Award ====
- In 2012, Katy Perry was honored with Billboard's second Spotlight award for being the second and first female artist in music history to have five consecutive number ones singles on Billboard Hot 100 from one album.

==== Change Maker Award ====
- 2020: Killer Mike
- 2021: Trae tha Truth
- 2022: Mari Copeny

==== Other special awards ====
- 1992: Special Award commemorating the 10th Anniversary of Thriller: Michael Jackson
- 1992: No. 1 World Album for Dangerous and No. 1 World Single for "Black or White": Michael Jackson
- 1993: Special Award for the first single with most weeks at No.1 on the Billboard Hot 100 (14 weeks for "I Will Always Love You"): Whitney Houston
- 1996: Special Award for most weeks at No. 1 on the Billboard Hot 100 (16 weeks for "One Sweet Day"): Mariah Carey and Boyz II Men
- 1997: Special Award honoring "Candle In the Wind 1997" as the all-time best selling single: Elton John and Bernie Taupin
- 1998: Special Award for the most No. 1s ever by a female artist (13): Mariah Carey
- 2000: Special Award for biggest one-week sales ever of an album: No Strings Attached, NSYNC
- 2000: Special Award for biggest one-week sales of an album ever by a female artist, Oops!... I Did It Again, Britney Spears
- 2001: Special Award for biggest one-week sales for an album in 2001: Celebrity, NSYNC
- 2002: Special Award for 1982 album Thriller, which spent more weeks at No. 1 (37) than any other album in the history of the Billboard 200: Michael Jackson
- 2003: Special Award for Most weeks at No. 1: Beyoncé (17 weeks with "Crazy in Love" featuring Jay-Z and "Baby Boy" featuring Sean Paul)

== Most wins ==
The record for most Billboard Music Awards won by an artist is held by Taylor Swift, earning 49 awards. The record for most Billboard Music Awards won by a group is held by BTS who have won 12 awards.

| Rank | Artist | Number of awards |
|---|---|---|
| 1 | Taylor Swift | 49 |
| 2 | Drake | 41 |
| 3 | Beyoncé | 28 |
| 4 | Justin Bieber | 26 |
| 5 | The Weeknd | 22 |
| 6 | Garth Brooks | 19 |
| 7 | Adele | 18 |
| 7 | Morgan Wallen | 18 |
| 7 | Usher | 18 |
| 7 | Kanye West | 18 |
| 11 | Eminem | 17 |
| 12 | Bad Bunny | 16 |
| 12 | Whitney Houston | 16 |
| 14 | Mariah Carey | 14 |
| 15 | 50 Cent | 13 |
| 16 | BTS | 12 |
| 16 | Carrie Underwood | 12 |
| 16 | George Michael | 12 |
| 16 | Rihanna | 12 |
| 16 | R.Kelly | 12 |
| 16 | T.I. | 12 |
| 22 | Destiny's Child | 11 |
| 22 | Janet Jackson | 11 |
| 22 | Mary J. Blige | 11 |
| 22 | Post Malone | 11 |
| 26 | Imagine Dragons | 10 |
| 26 | Lady Gaga | 10 |

Most Wins in a single ceremony

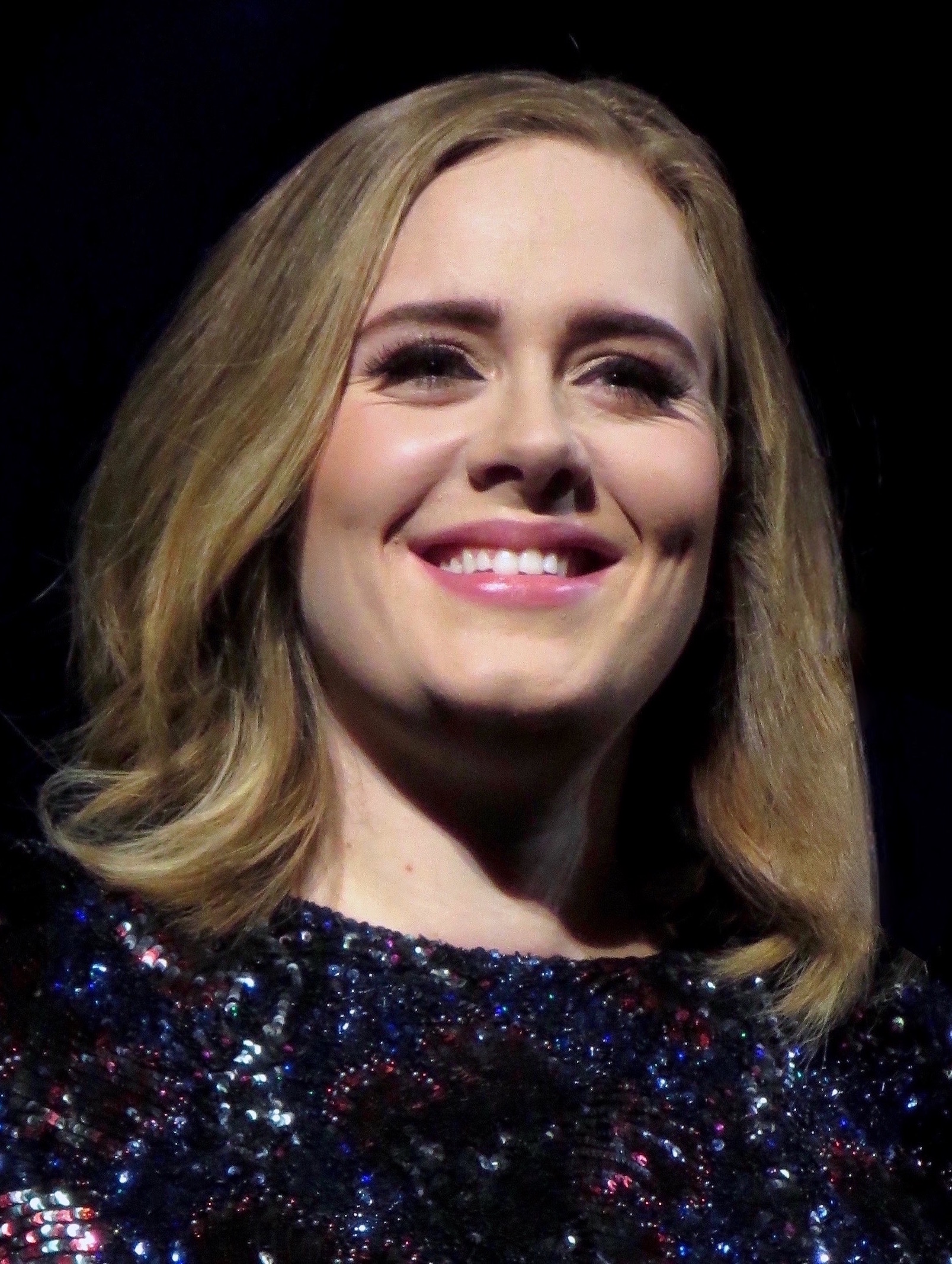
Adele won the most awards by a female artist in one ceremony.

| Rank | Artist | Most wins |
|---|---|---|
| 1 | Drake | 13 |
| 2 | Adele | 12 |
| 3 | Whitney Houston | 11 |

== Performances ==
| Year | Performers (chronologically) |
|---|---|
| 2011 | Rihanna & Britney Spears; The Black Eyed Peas; Keith Urban; Pitbull (feat. Nayer & Ne-Yo); Beyoncé; CeeLo Green (feat. Mikky Ekko); Lady Antebellum; Taio Cruz; OneRepublic (feat. Far East Movement & Snoop Dogg); Mary J. Blige (feat. Lil Wayne); Kesha; Nicki Minaj (feat. Britney Spears); Neil Diamond |
| 2012 | LMFAO; Kelly Clarkson; The Wanted; Chris Brown; Natasha Bedingfield; Usher; Justin Bieber; Carly Rae Jepsen; Carrie Underwood; Linkin Park; Katy Perry; John Legend & Jordin Sparks; Goodie Mob; Patent Pending; Nelly Furtado; Stevie Wonder & Alicia Keys |
| 2013 | Bruno Mars; Selena Gomez; The Band Perry; Icona Pop; Chris Brown; Macklemore & Ryan Lewis (feat. Wanz); Taylor Swift; Kacey Musgraves; David Guetta (feat. Chris Brown & Lil Wayne); Justin Bieber; Pitbull (feat. Christina Aguilera & Morten Harket); Miguel; Ed Sheeran; Jennifer Lopez (feat. Pitbull); will.i.am (feat. Justin Bieber); David Guetta (feat. Akon & Ne-Yo); Nicki Minaj (feat. Lil Wayne); Prince |
| 2014 | Pitbull (feat. Jennifer Lopez & Claudia Leitte); OneRepublic; Iggy Azalea (feat. Charli XCX & Ariana Grande); Florida Georgia Line (feat. Luke Bryan); Shakira; 5 Seconds of Summer; Katy Perry; Imagine Dragons; Michael Jackson (Virtual Performance); Ricky Martin; Luke Bryan; Lorde; Miranda Lambert & Carrie Underwood; John Legend; Jason Derulo (feat. Snoop Dogg & 2 Chainz); Miley Cyrus (feat. The Flaming Lips); Robin Thicke; Jennifer Lopez |
| 2015 | Van Halen; Fall Out Boy (feat. Wiz Khalifa); Nick Jonas; Meghan Trainor & John Legend; Mariah Carey; Wiz Khalifa & Charlie Puth; Jussie Smollett, Bryshere 'Yazz' Gray & Estelle; Hozier; Little Big Town & Faith Hill; Pitbull (feat. Chris Brown); Ed Sheeran; Britney Spears & Iggy Azalea; Nicki Minaj & David Guetta; Tori Kelly; Simple Minds; Kelly Clarkson; Imagine Dragons; Kanye West |
| 2016 | Britney Spears; Shawn Mendes; Fifth Harmony (feat. Ty Dolla Sign); Meghan Trainor; Justin Bieber; P!nk; Nick Jonas (feat. Tove Lo); Demi Lovato; Lukas Graham; Blake Shelton & Gwen Stefani; DNCE; Kesha & Ben Folds; Rihanna; Celine Dion; Troye Sivan; The Go-Go's; Ariana Grande; Madonna & Stevie Wonder |
| 2017 | Nicki Minaj (featuring Lil Wayne, David Guetta & Jason Derulo); Camila Cabello; The Chainsmokers; Julia Michaels; Ed Sheeran; Miley Cyrus; Lorde; Sam Hunt; Celine Dion; Imagine Dragons; Drake; Halsey; Florida Georgia Line & John Legend; Cher; Bruno Mars |
| 2018 | Ariana Grande; Kelly Clarkson; Dua Lipa; Shawn Mendes; Khalid & Normani; John Legend; Christina Aguilera & Demi Lovato; Ed Sheeran; Jennifer Lopez (feat. DJ Khaled); Shawn Mendes & Khalid; Zedd (feat. Maren Morris & Grey); Janet Jackson; Macklemore & Kesha; Camila Cabello (feat. Pharrell Williams); BTS; Salt-N-Pepa (feat. En Vogue & Kelly Clarkson) |
| 2019 | Taylor Swift (feat. Brendon Urie); Kelly Clarkson; Halsey; Ciara; Dan + Shay & Tori Kelly; Jonas Brothers; Khalid; Ariana Grande; Madonna & Maluma; Lauren Daigle; Mariah Carey; Panic! at the Disco; BTS (feat. Halsey); Paula Abdul |
| 2020 | Kelly Clarkson (feat. Pentatonix); Sia; Kane Brown, Swae Lee & Khalid; Alicia Keys; Luke Combs; Post Malone & Tyla Yaweh; Brandy (featuring Ty Dolla Sign); John Legend; Bad Bunny, Ivy Queen & Nesi; Doja Cat; Garth Brooks; Saint Jhn; Demi Lovato; BTS; En Vogue |
| 2021 | DJ Khaled (feat. H.E.R. & Migos); Doja Cat (feat. SZA); Twenty One Pilots; Alicia Keys; AJR; P!nk; Jam and Lewis, Sounds of Blackness & Ann Nesby; Karol G; BTS; Bad Bunny; Glass Animals; The Weeknd; Duran Duran (feat. Graham Coxon ); Jonas Brothers & Marshmello |
| 2022 | Sean "Diddy" Combs (feat. Bryson Tiller, Jack Harlow and Teyana Taylor); Silk Sonic; Rauw Alejandro; Florence and the Machine; Miranda Lambert & Elle King; Latto; Morgan Wallen; Megan Thee Stallion; Dan + Shay; Travis Scott; Machine Gun Kelly; Ed Sheeran; Becky G; Maxwell; Burna Boy |
| 2023 | Karol G; David Guetta & Bebe Rexha; NewJeans; Tate McRae; Peso Pluma; Mariah Carey; Stray Kids; Morgan Wallen |
| 2024 | Shaboozey; Teddy Swims; Megan Moroney; Tyla; Jelly Roll; Stray Kids; Coldplay; Fuerza Regida; Seventeen; Linkin Park |

== Broadcast ==
Since its inception (created by Rick Garson, Paul Flattery & Jim Yukich), the BMAs had been telecast on the Fox network; however due to contractual expirations and other unforeseen circumstances, the awards were cancelled for 2007. Plans for a new version of the BMAs in 2008 (in association with AEG Live) fell through and were not held until 2011.

On February 17, 2011, Billboard announced that the BMAs would return to television, moving from its original home on Fox to its new network, ABC, on May 22. A new award statuette was created by New York firm Society Awards. Dick Clark Productions, which is co-owned with Billboard, began producing the ceremony in 2014. On November 28, 2017, it was announced that the Billboard Music Awards would move from ABC to NBC beginning in 2018 under a multi-year contract.

The 2020 ceremony, originally scheduled for April 29, was postponed indefinitely on March 17 due to coronavirus-related public assembly concerns. On August 14, 2020, it was announced that the 2020 ceremony had been rescheduled to October 14.

On November 25, 2024, it was announced that the BMAs would return to Fox with a pre-recorded special on December 12. It also streamed live on Amazon Fire TV Channels and on-demand on Paramount+.

== Ratings ==
| Year | Day | Date | Network | 18–49 rating | | Viewers (in millions) | Ref. |
| Year | Day | Date | Network | Rating | Share | Viewers (in millions) | Ref. |
|---|---|---|---|---|---|---|---|
| 1990 | Monday | December 10 | Fox | | | 14.50 | |
| 1991 | Monday | December 9 | Fox | | | 11.60 | |
| 1992 | Wednesday | December 9 | Fox | | | 15.00 | |
| 1993 | Wednesday | December 8 | Fox | | | 14.00 | |
| 1994 | Wednesday | December 7 | Fox | | | 11.10 | |
| 1995 | Wednesday | December 6 | Fox | | | 12.10 | |
| 1996 | Wednesday | December 4 | Fox | | | 11.60 | |
| 1997 | Monday | December 8 | Fox | | | 12.81 | |
| 1998 | Monday | December 7 | Fox | | | 11.36 | |
| 1999 | Wednesday | December 8 | Fox | | | 12.12 | |
| 2000 | Tuesday | December 5 | Fox | 5.4 | 14 | 11.43 | |
| 2001 | Tuesday | December 4 | Fox | 5.6 | 15 | 11.70 | |
| 2002 | Monday | December 9 | Fox | 4.3 | 11 | 9.36 | |
| 2003 | Wednesday | December 10 | Fox | 4.6 | 12 | 9.81 | |
| 2004 | Wednesday | December 8 | Fox | 3.1 | 8 | 6.87 | |
| 2005 | Tuesday | December 6 | Fox | 3.1 | 8 | 6.38 | |
| 2006 | Monday | December 4 | Fox | 2.7 | 7 | 6.09 | |
| 2007–2010 | —N/a | Not held | —N/a | —N/a | —N/a | —N/a | —N/a |
| 2011 | Sunday | May 22 | ABC | 3.0 | 8 | 7.88 | |
| 2012 | Sunday | May 20 | ABC | 2.7 | 7 | 7.40 | |
| 2013 | Sunday | May 19 | ABC | 3.5 | 10 | 9.48 | |
| 2014 | Sunday | May 18 | ABC | 3.5 | 10 | 10.50 | |
| 2015 | Sunday | May 17 | ABC | 3.8 | 12 | 11.18 | |
| 2016 | Sunday | May 22 | ABC | 3.2 | 10 | 9.76 | |
| 2017 | Sunday | May 21 | ABC | 2.6 | 9 | 8.70 | |
| 2018 | Sunday | May 20 | NBC | 2.4 | 9 | 7.87 | |
| 2019 | Wednesday | May 1 | NBC | 2.1 | 10 | 8.01 | |
| 2020 | Wednesday | October 14 | NBC | 0.8 | 5 | 3.71 | |
| 2021 | Sunday | May 23 | NBC | 0.7 | 4 | 2.77 | |
| 2022 | Sunday | May 15 | NBC | 0.7 | 6 | 2.56 | |

== See also ==
- Billboard Live Music Awards
- Billboard Japan Music Awards
- Billboard Latin Music Awards
- Billboard Women in Music
- Billboard Decade-End
- Billboard Digital Entertainment Awards
