= 1992 Billboard Music Awards =

American music award ceremony

- Location: Universal Amphitheatre, Universal City, California, U.S.
- Hosted by: Phil Collins

Highlights
- Most awards: Michael Jackson (3)

Television/radio coverage
- Network: Fox

Finalists and winners at the 1992 Billboard Music Awards.

== Winners ==
Album With Most Weeks at No. 1	No. 1 Hot 100 Single
Billy Ray Cyrus - Some Gave All	Boyz II Men - "End of the Road"
No. 1 Rap Singles Artist	No. 1 Pop Artist
Cypress Hill	Garth Brooks
Concert Event of the Year	Century Award
Genesis	George Harrison
No. 1 Albums Artist Group	No. 1 R&B Artist
Guns N’ Roses	Jodeci
Debut Artist of the Year	No. 1 World Album
Kris Kross	Michael Jackson - Dangerous
No. 1 World Single	Special Award Commemorating the 10th Anniversary of "Thriller"
Michael Jackson - "Black or White"	Michael Jackson
No. 1 Adult Contemporary Artist	No. 1 Rock Artist
Richard Marx	U2
No. 1 Country Single
Wynonna - "I Saw the Light"
