= Billboard Music Award for Top Country Album =

Annual American music award

The Billboard Music Award winners for Top Country Album. Recipients include Garth Brooks, Tim McGraw, Jason Aldean, Chris Stapleton, Taylor Swift, and Carrie Underwood.

== Winners and nominees ==
Winners are listed first and highlighted in bold.

=== 1990s ===
Year	Album	Artist	Ref.
1990	**Killin' Time**	**Clint Black**	
1991	**No Fences**	**Garth Brooks**	
1992	**Ropin' the Wind**	**Garth Brooks**	
1993-94	—N/a		
1995	**The Hits**	**Garth Brooks**	
1995	Not a Moment Too Soon	Tim McGraw	
1995	John Michael Montgomery	John Michael Montgomery	
1995	The Woman in Me	Shania Twain	
1996-97	—N/a		
1998	**Sevens**	**Garth Brooks**	
1998	Come On Over	Shania Twain	
1998	You Light Up My Life: Inspirational Songs	LeAnn Rimes	
1998	Hope Floats	Dave Grusin	
1999	—N/a		

=== 2000s ===
Year	Album	Artist	Ref.
2000	**Fly**	**Dixie Chicks**	
2000	Breathe	Faith Hill	
2000	Come on Over	Shania Twain	
2000	A Place in the Sun	Tim McGraw	
2001	**Greatest Hits**	**Tim McGraw**	
2001	Breathe	Faith Hill	
2001	Coyote Ugly	Various Artists	
2001	O Brother, Where Art Thou?	Various Artists	
2002	—N/a		
2003	**Up!**	**Shania Twain**	
2003	Home	Dixie Chicks	
2003	Tim McGraw and the Dancehall Doctors	Tim McGraw	
2003	Unleashed	Toby Keith	
2004-5	—N/a		
2006	**Some Hearts**	**Carrie Underwood**	
2006	The Legend of Johnny Cash	Johnny Cash	
2006	Me and My Gang	Rascal Flatts	
2006	The Road and the Radio	Kenny Chesney	
2007-9	—N/a		

=== 2010s ===
Year	Album	Artist	Ref.
2011	**Speak Now**	**Taylor Swift**	
2011	My Kinda Party	Jason Aldean	
2011	Need You Now	Lady Antebellum	
2011	The Incredible Machine	Sugarland	
2011	The Foundation	Zac Brown Band	
2012	**My Kinda Party**	**Jason Aldean**	
2012	The Band Perry	The Band Perry	
2012	Scotty McCreery	Clear as Day	
2012	Own the Night	Lady Antebellum	
2012	Tailgates & Tanlines	Luke Bryan	
2013	**Red**	**Taylor Swift**	
2013	Night Train	Jason Aldean	
2013	Tailgates & Tanlines	Luke Bryan	
2013	Tuskegee	Lionel Richie	
2013	Blown Away	Carrie Underwood	
2014	**Crash My Party**	**Luke Bryan**	
2014	Blame It All on My Roots: Five Decades of Influences	Garth Brooks	
2014	Here's to the Good Times	Florida Georgia Line	
2014	Duck the Halls: A Robertson Family Christmas	The Robertsons	
2014	Based on a True Story...	Blake Shelton	
2015	**Old Boots, New Dirt**	**Jason Aldean**	
2015	Man Against Machine	Garth Brooks	
2015	Crash My Party	Luke Bryan	
2015	Just as I Am	Brantley Gilbert	
2015	Platinum	Miranda Lambert	
2016	**Traveller**	**Chris Stapleton**	
2016	Kill the Lights	Luke Bryan	
2016	Montevallo	Sam Hunt	
2016	Jekyll + Hyde	Zac Brown Band	
2016	Storyteller	Carrie Underwood	
2017	**Traveller**	**Chris Stapleton**	
2017	Dig Your Roots	Florida Georgia Line	
2017	If I'm Honest	Blake Shelton	
2017	Ripcord	Keith Urban	
2017	They Don't Know	Jason Aldean	
2018	**From A Room: Volume 1**	**Chris Stapleton**	
2018	Kane Brown	Kane Brown	
2018	This One's for You	Luke Combs	
2018	Life Changes	Thomas Rhett	
2018	Brett Young	Brett Young	
2019	**This One's for You**	**Luke Combs**	
2019	Rearview Town	Jason Aldean	
2019	Kane Brown	Kane Brown	
2019	Dan + Shay	Dan + Shay	
2019	Cry Pretty	Carrie Underwood	

=== 2020s ===
Year	Album	Artist	Ref.
2020	**What You See Is What You Get**	**Luke Combs**	
2020	Experiment	Kane Brown	
2020	Girl	Maren Morris	
2020	Center Point Road	Thomas Rhett	
2020	If I Know Me	Morgan Wallen	
2021	**Dangerous: The Double Album**	**Morgan Wallen**	
2021	Goldmine	Gabby Barrett	
2021	Southside	Sam Hunt	
2021	Starting Over	Chris Stapleton	
2021	My Gift	Carrie Underwood	
2022	**Red (Taylor's Version)**	**Taylor Swift**	
2022	Hey World	Lee Brice	
2022	Life Rolls On	Florida Georgia Line	
2022	Country Stuff: The Album	Walker Hayes	
2022	Fearless (Taylor's Version)	Taylor Swift	
2023	**One Thing at a Time**	**Morgan Wallen**	
2023	American Heartbreak	Zach Bryan	
2023	Gettin' Old	Luke Combs	
2023	Growin' Up	Luke Combs	
2023	Speak Now (Taylor's Version)	Taylor Swift	
2024	**Zach Bryan**	**Zach Bryan**	
2024	Cowboy Carter	Beyoncé	
2024	The Great American Bar Scene	Zach Bryan	
2024	Higher	Chris Stapleton	
2024	Religiously. The Album.	Bailey Zimmerman	

== Multiple wins and nominations ==
The following individuals received two or more Top Country Album Awards:

Wins	Artist
4	Garth Brooks
3	Chris Stapleton
3	Taylor Swift
2	Jason Aldean
2	Luke Combs
2	Morgan Wallen

The following individuals received two or more Top Country Album nominations:

Nominations	Artist
6	Jason Aldean
6	Garth Brooks
5	Luke Bryan
5	Luke Combs
5	Taylor Swift
5	Carrie Underwood
4	Chris Stapleton
3	Kane Brown
3	Tim McGraw
3	LeAnn Rimes
3	Shania Twain
3	Morgan Wallen
2	Dixie Chicks
2	Florida Georgia Line
2	Faith Hill
2	Sam Hunt
2	Lady Antebellum
2	Thomas Rhett
2	Blake Shelton
2	Zac Brown Band
