= 2004 Billboard Music Awards =

Annual American music awards ceremony

- Date: December 8, 2004
- Location: MGM Grand Garden Arena, Paradise, Nevada, U.S.
- Hosted by: Ryan Seacrest

Highlights
- Most awards: Usher (13)
- Most nominations: Usher (21)

Television/radio coverage
- Network: FOX

The 2004 Billboard Music Awards were held December 8, 2004 at the MGM Grand Garden Arena on the Las Vegas Strip. The awards recognized the most popular artists and albums from 2004. Usher is the biggest winner of the night with thirteen awards and then Alicia Keys with seven.

== Performances ==
- Usher – Burn, My Boo (featuring Alicia Keys)
- Maroon 5 – This Love
- Evanescence – My Immortal
- Jennifer Lopez – I'm Real
- Beyoncé – Crazy In Love (featuring Jay-Z)
- Alicia Keys – If I Ain't Got You
- Hoobastank – The Reason
- The Black Eyed Peas – Hey Mama, Let's Get It Started
- Gwen Stefani – What You Waiting For?/Rich Girl
- Diana Ross – For Once In My Life

== Winners and nominees ==
Winners are listed first and in bold.

Artist of the Year	Male Artist of the Year
**Usher**; Alicia Keys; Maroon 5; OutKast	**Usher**; Toby Keith; Twista; Kanye West
Female Artist of the Year	Duo/Group of the Year
**Alicia Keys**; Beyoncé; Norah Jones; Britney Spears	**OutKast**; Hoobastank; Linkin Park; Maroon 5
New Male Artist of the Year	New Female Artist of the Year
**Kanye West**; J-Kwon; Ruben Studdard; Mario Winans	**Ashlee Simpson**; Ciara; JoJo; Gretchen Wilson
Male Billboard 200 Album Artist of the Year	Female Billboard 200 Album Artist of the Year
**Usher**; Kenny Chesney; Josh Groban; Toby Keith	**Norah Jones**; Hilary Duff; Alicia Keys; Britney Spears
Billboard 200 Album Duo/Group of the Year	Album of the Year
**OutKast**; Evanescence; Linkin Park; Maroon 5	**Confessions – Usher**; Closer – Josh Groban; The Diary of Alicia Keys – Alicia Keys; Speakerboxxx/The Love Below – OutKast
Male Hot 100 Artist of the Year	Female Hot 100 Artist of the Year
**Usher**; Ludacris; Twista; Kanye West	**Alicia Keys**; Beyoncé; Ciara; Britney Spears
Hot 100 Duo/Group of the Year	Hot 100 Producer of the Year
**OutKast**; Hoobastank; Maroon 5; Nickelback	**Lil Jon**; Alicia Keys; Scott Storch; Kanye West
Hot 100 Songwriter of the Year	Hot 100 Single of the Year
**Alicia Keys**; R. Kelly; Lil Jon; Kanye West	**"Yeah!" – Usher featuring Lil Jon and Ludacris**; "If I Ain't Got You" – Alicia Keys; "This Love" – Maroon 5; "Burn" – Usher
Hot 100 Airplay Song of the Year	Top-Selling Single of the Year
**"Yeah!" – Usher featuring Lil Jon and Ludacris**; "If I Ain't Got You" – Alicia Keys; "This Love" – Maroon 5; "Burn" – Usher	**"I Believe" – Fantasia**; "Solitaire / The Way" – Clay Aiken; "Dreams" – Diana DeGarmo; "F**k It (I Don't Want You Back)" – Eamon
Digital Artist of the Year	Digital Song of the Year
**Maroon 5**; The Black Eyed Peas; OutKast; Usher	**"Hey Ya!" – OutKast**; "Let's Get It Started" – The Black Eyed Peas; "The Reason" – Hoobastank; "This Love" – Maroon 5
Mainstream Top 40 Artist of the Year	Mainstream Top 40 Single of the Year
**Usher**; Maroon 5; OutKast; Britney Spears	**"Yeah!" – Usher featuring Lil Jon and Ludacris**; "The Reason" – Hoobastank; "Leave (Get Out)" – JoJo; "This Love" – Maroon 5
Ringtone of the Year	R&B/Hip-Hop Artist of the Year
**"In da Club" – 50 Cent**; "P.I.M.P." – 50 Cent; "Dirt off Your Shoulder" – Jay-Z; "Hey Ya!" – OutKast	**Usher**; R. Kelly; Alicia Keys; Kanye West
New R&B/Hip-Hop Artist of the Year	Male R&B/Hip-Hop Artist of the Year
**Kanye West**; G-Unit; Anthony Hamilton; Ruben Studdard	**Usher**; Jay-Z; R. Kelly; Kanye West
Female R&B/Hip-Hop Artist of the Year	R&B/Hip-Hop Duo/Group Artist of the Year
**Alicia Keys**; Beyoncé; Ciara; Monica	**OutKast**; G-Unit; Jagged Edge; Terror Squad
R&B/Hip-Hop Producer of the Year	R&B/Hip-Hop Album Artist of the Year
**Kanye West**; R. Kelly; Lil Jon; Alicia Keys	**Usher**; Jay-Z; R. Kelly; Alicia Keys
R&B/Hip-Hop Album of the Year	R&B/Hip-Hop Songs Artist of the Year
**Confessions – Usher**; The Black Album – Jay-Z; The Diary of Alicia Keys – Alicia Keys; The College Dropout – Kanye West	**Alicia Keys**; R. Kelly; Usher; Kanye West
R&B/Hip-Hop Single of the Year	R&B/Hip-Hop Airplay Song of the Year
**"If I Ain't Got You" – Alicia Keys**; "Diary" – Alicia Keys featuring Tony! Toni! Toné!; "Burn" – Usher; "Yeah!" – Usher featuring Lil Jon and Ludacris	**"If I Ain't Got You" – Alicia Keys**; "Diary" – Alicia Keys featuring Tony! Toni! Toné!; "Burn" – Usher; "Yeah!" – Usher featuring Lil Jon and Ludacris
Top-Selling R&B/Hip-Hop Single of the Year	Rap Artist of the Year
**"I Believe" – Fantasia**; "Me, Myself and I" – Beyoncé; "Stand Up in It" – Theodis Ealy; "F**k It (I Don't Want You Back)" – Eamon	**Kanye West**; Jay-Z; Ludacris; Twista
Rap Single of the Year	Country Artist of the Year
**"Lean Back" – Terror Squad**; "Tipsy" – J-Kwon; "Slow Motion" – Juvenile featuring Soulja Slim; "Freak-a-Leek" – Petey Pablo	**Toby Keith**; Kenny Chesney; Alan Jackson; Tim McGraw
New Country Artist of the Year	Male Country Artist of the Year
**Gretchen Wilson**; Big & Rich; Josh Gracin; Josh Turner	**Toby Keith**; Kenny Chesney; Alan Jackson; Tim McGraw
Female Country Artist of the Year	Country Duo/Group of the Year
**Gretchen Wilson**; Sara Evans; Martina McBride; Shania Twain	**Rascal Flatts**; Big & Rich; Brooks & Dunn; Lonestar
New Male Country Artist of the Year	New Female Country Artist of the Year
**Josh Gracin**	**Gretchen Wilson**
New Country Duo/Group of the Year	Country Album of the Year
**Big & Rich**	**Shock'n Y'all – Toby Keith**; When the Sun Goes Down – Kenny Chesney; Live Like You Were Dying – Tim McGraw; Here for the Party – Gretchen Wilson
Country Song of the Year	Modern Rock Artist of the Year
**"Live Like You Were Dying" – Tim McGraw**; "When the Sun Goes Down" – Kenny Chesney; "Remember When" – Alan Jackson; "You'll Think of Me" – Keith Urban	**Linkin Park**; Incubus; Jet; Three Days Grace
Independent Album Artist of the Year	Independent Album of the Year
**Lil Jon & the East Side Boyz**; Dashboard Confessional; Taking Back Sunday; Ying Yang Twins	**Kings of Crunk – Lil Jon & the East Side Boyz**; Part II – Lil Jon & the East Side Boyz; Where You Want to Be – Taking Back Sunday; Me & My Brother – Ying Yang Twins
Top-Selling Dance Single of the Year	Artist Achievement Award
**"Me Against the Music" – Britney Spears featuring Madonna**; "Love Profusion" – Madonna; "Nothing Fails / Nobody Knows Me" – Madonna; "Amazing" – George Michael	Destiny's Child
Billboard Century Award
Stevie Wonder

=== Artists with multiple wins and nominations ===
Artists that received multiple nominations
Nominations	Artist
21	Usher
19	Alicia Keys
12	Kanye West
10	Maroon 5
10	OutKast
8	Lil Jon
7	Ludacris
6	R. Kelly
5	Kenny Chesney
5	Hoobastank
5	Toby Keith
5	Britney Spears
5	Gretchen Wilson
4	Beyoncé
4	Tim McGraw
3	Big & Rich
3	Ciara
3	Alan Jackson
3	Lil Jon & the East Side Boyz
3	Linkin Park
3	Madonna
3	Twista
2	The Black Eyed Peas
2	Eamon
2	Fantasia
2	50 Cent
2	G-Unit
2	Josh Gracin
2	Josh Groban
2	J-Kwon
2	JoJo
2	Norah Jones
2	Ruben Studdard
2	Terror Squad
2	Tony! Toni! Toné!

Artists that received multiple awards
Wins	Artist
13	Usher
7	Alicia Keys
5	OutKast
4	Lil Jon
4	Kanye West
3	Toby Keith
3	Ludacris
3	Gretchen Wilson
2	Fantasia
2	Lil Jon & the East Side Boyz
