= 2003 Billboard Music Awards =

Annual American music awards ceremony

- Date: December 10, 2003
- Location: MGM Grand Garden Arena, Las Vegas, Nevada, U.S.
- Hosted by: Ryan Seacrest, Nick Lachey, and Jessica Simpson

These are the winners of the 2003 Billboard Music Awards, an awards show based on chart performance, and number of downloads and total airplay. Beyoncé won 5 awards out of 6 nominations, while R Kelly and 50 Cent both won 4 awards out of 5 nominations.

== Winners and nominees ==
Winners are listed first and in bold.

| Artist of the Year | New Artist of the Year |
|---|---|
| **50 Cent**; R. Kelly; Sean Paul; Justin Timberlake | Beyoncé; Chingy; Evanescence; Justin Timberlake |
| Duo/Group of the Year | R&B Artist of the Year |
| **3 Doors Down**; Dixie Chicks; Linkin Park; Matchbox Twenty | **50 Cent**; Aaliyah; Jay-Z; R. Kelly |
| Rap Artist of the Year | Country Artist of the Year |
| **50 Cent**; Chingy; Fabolous; Sean Paul | **Shania Twain**; Dixie Chicks; Toby Keith; Tim McGraw |
| Country Album of the Year | Rock Artist of the Year |
| **Shania Twain - Up!**; Dixie Chicks - Home; Tim McGraw - Tim McGraw and the Dancehall Doctors; Toby Keith - Unleashed | **Audioslave**; 3 Doors Down; Disturbed; Trapt |
| Rock Single of the Year | Hot 100 duo/group of the Year |
| **Trapt - "Headstrong"**; The White Stripes - "Seven Nation Army"; Audioslave - "Like a Stone"; Chevelle - "Send the Pain Below" | **3 Doors Down**; Dixie Chicks; Matchbox Twenty; Santana |
| R&B/Hip-Hop group of the Year | Female new artist of the Year |
| **Lil Jon & The East Side Boyz**; B2K; Dru Hill; Floetry | **Beyoncé** |
| Modern rock artist of the Year | New R&B/Hip-Hop artist of the Year |
| **Audioslave**; Linkin Park; Foo Fighters; Chevelle | **Beyoncé**; Chingy; Floetry; Heather Headley |
| Top digital song of the Year | Hot 100 producer of the Year |
| **Outkast - "Hey Ya!"**; Coldplay - "Clocks"; The Black Eyed Peas - "Where Is the Love?"; Beyoncé feat. Jay Z - "Crazy in Love" | **R. Kelly**; The Neptunes; Timbaland; Lenky |
| Hot 100 songwriter of the Year | R&B/Hip-Hop producer of the Year |
| **R. Kelly** | **R. Kelly** |
| Country album Artist of the Year | Independent album Artist of the Year |
| **Shania Twain** | **Lil Jon & The East Side Boyz** |
| New Group of the Year | Independent Album of the Year |
| **Evanescence** | **Lil Jon & The East Side Boyz - Kings of Crunk** |
| Hot 100 Award for Most Weeks at No. 1 | Hot 100 single of the Year |
| **Beyoncé feat. Jay Z - "Crazy in Love"**; **Beyoncé feat. Sean Paul - "Baby Boy",** | ( for winner): Beyoncé and Jay-Z - "Crazy in Love"; Sean Paul - "Get Busy"; R. Kelly - "Ignition"; 50 Cent - "In da Club" |
| Rhythmic Top 40 title of the Year | New male R&B artist of the Year |
| **Chingy - "Right Thurr"** | **Chingy** |
| Male Hot 100 artist of the Year | Female Hot 100 artist of the Year |
| ( for winner): 50 Cent; Justin Timberlake; R. Kelly; Sean Paul | **Beyoncé**; Aaliyah; Christina Aguilera; Ashanti |
| No. 1 classical crossover artist of the Year | No. 1 classical crossover album of the Year |
| **Josh Groban** | **Closer** |
| Soundtrack Single of the Year | Mainstream Top 40 Single of the Year |
| **"Bring Me to Life"** | **The Black Eyed Peas - "Where Is the Love?"** |
| Top-selling single of the Year | Top Billboard 200 Album of the Year |
| **Clay Aiken - "Bridge over Troubled Water" and "This Is the Night"**; American Idol 2 Finalists - "God Bless the U.S.A."; Kid Rock feat. Allison Moorer - "Picture"; Ruben Studdard - "Flying Without Wings" and "Superstar" | **50 Cent - Get Rich or Die Tryin'**; Dixie Chicks - Home; Norah Jones - Come Away with Me; Shania Twain - Up! |
| R&B Songwriter of the Year | Internet Artist of the Year |
| **R. Kelly** | ( for winner): Dave Matthews; Josh Groban; Norah Jones; Rod Stewart |
Billboard Century Award
Sting
