= 1990 Billboard Music Awards =

American music award ceremony

- Location: Barker Hangar, Santa Monica, California, U.S.
- Hosted by: Paul Shaffer & Morris Day with Jerome Benton
- Website: http://www.billboard.com/bbma/

Television/radio coverage
- Network: Fox

Here are the finalists and winners at the 1990 Billboard Music Awards.

== Winners ==
#1 Adult Contemporary Male Artist	#1 Adult Contemporary Female Artist
Phil Collins	Gloria Estefan
#1 Adult Contemporary Single	#1 Album Rock Tracks Artist
Phil Collins - Do You Remember?	Eric Clapton
#1 Concert Gross	#1 Country Album
Paul McCartney	Clint Black - Killin' Time
#1 Country Albums Artist	#1 Country Artist
Randy Travis	Randy Travis
#1 Country Single	#1 Dance Club Play Artist
Clint Black	Janet Jackson
#1 Hot 100 Single	#1 Hot 100 Singles Artist
Wilson Phillips - Hold On	Janet Jackson
#1 Hot Dance 12-inch Singles Sales Artist	#1 New Pop Artist
Janet Jackson	Bell Biv DeVoe
#1 New Pop Male Artist	#1 New Pop Female Artist
Young M.C.	Lisa Stansfield
#1 R&B Album	#1 R&B Albums Artist
Janet Jackson - Janet Jackson's Rhythm Nation 1814	Janet Jackson
#1 R&B Artist	#1 R&B Single
Janet Jackson	En Vogue - Hold On
#1 R&B Singles Artist	#1 Pop Album
Janet Jackson	Janet Jackson - Janet Jackson's Rhythm Nation 1814
#1 Pop Artist	#1 Pop/Rap Artist
New Kids on the Block	MC Hammer
#1 World Album	#1 World Single
Phil Collins - ...But Seriously; Paula Abdul - Forever Your Girl; Milli Vanilli - Girl You Know It's True; Bonnie Raitt - Nick of Time	Sinéad O'Connor - Nothing Compares 2 U
Album With Most Weeks at #1
MC Hammer - Please Hammer, Don't Hurt 'Em
