= 1991 Billboard Music Awards =

Annual American music awards ceremony

- Location: Barker Hangar, Santa Monica, California, U.S.
- Hosted by: Paul Shaffer
- Website: http://www.billboard.com/bbma/

Television/radio coverage
- Network: Fox

Here are the finalists and winners at the 1991 Billboard Music Awards.

== Winners ==
#1 R&B Album	#1 Albums Artist
Whitney Houston – I'm Your Baby Tonight	Garth Brooks
#1 Country Album	#1 Country Singles Artist
Garth Brooks – No Fences	Garth Brooks
#1 Country Artist	#1 Country Albums Artist
Garth Brooks	Garth Brooks
#1 Rap Singles Artist	#1 Hot 100 Singles Artist
LL Cool J	Mariah Carey
#1 Album	#1 Adult Contemporary Artist
Mariah Carey – Mariah Carey	Mariah Carey
#1 Pop Artist	#1 Album Rock Track
Mariah Carey	Queensrÿche – Silent Lucidity
#1 Modern Rock Artist	#1 World Album
R.E.M.	R.E.M. – Out of Time
#1 New Pop Male Artist	#1 R&B Single
Ralph Tresvant	Rude Boys – Written All Over Your Face
#1 R&B Singles Artist	#1 Album Rock Artist
Whitney Houston	Van Halen
#1 R&B Albums Artist	#1 R&B Artist
Whitney Houston	Whitney Houston
#1 Country Single	#1 Hot 100 Single
Alan Jackson – Don't Rock the Jukebox	Bryan Adams – (Everything I Do) I Do It For You
#1 World Single	#1 New Pop Artist
Bryan Adams – (Everything I Do) I Do It For You	C + C Music Factory
#1 Hot Dance Club Play Single	#1 Hot Dance Club Play Artist
C + C Music Factory featuring Freedom Williams – Gonna Make You Sweat (Everybody Dance Now)	C + C Music Factory
#1 Hot Dance 12" Singles Sales	#1 Hot Dance 12" Singles Artist
C + C Music Factory featuring Freedom Williams – Gonna Make You Sweat (Everybody Dance Now)	C + C Music Factory
#1 New Pop Female Artist	#1 Hot Dance Club Play Single
Cathy Dennis	C + C Music Factory featuring Freedom Williams – Gonna Make You Sweat (Everybody Dance Now)
