= 2002 Billboard Music Awards =

Annual American music awards ceremony

- Date: December 9, 2002
- Location: MGM Grand Garden Arena, Las Vegas, Nevada, U.S.
- Hosted by: Cedric the Entertainer

These are the winners of the 2002 Billboard Music Awards, an awards show based on chart performance, and number of downloads and total airplay. All winners are in bold.

== Winners and nominees ==
=== Artist of the Year ===
- **Nelly**
  - Ashanti
  - Eminem
  - Creed

=== Male Artist of the Year ===
- **Nelly**
  - Eminem
  - Ja Rule
  - Usher

=== Female Artist of the Year ===
- **Ashanti**
  - Avril Lavigne
  - Jennifer Lopez
  - P!nk

=== Duo/Group of the Year ===
- **Creed**
  - Linkin Park
  - Puddle of Mudd
  - Nickelback

=== Single of the year ===
- **How You Remind Me -** **Nickelback**
- Hot in Herre - Nelly
- Foolish - Ashanti
- Dilemma - Nelly and Kelly Rowland

=== Hot 100 Singles Group/Duo of the year ===
- **Nickelback**
- Puddle of Mudd
- Creed
- The Calling

=== Rap Artist of the year ===
- **Nelly**
- Fat Joe
- Ludacris
- Ja Rule

=== Rock Artist of the year ===
- **Puddle of Mudd**
- Creed
- Nickelback
- Staind

=== Rock Song of the year ===
- **Blurry**, Puddle of Mudd
- I Stand Alone, Godsmack
- Wasting My Time, Default
- For You, Staind

=== Dance Artist of the year ===
- **Cher**
- Kylie Minogue
- Kim English
- Enrique Iglesias
- Michael Jackson

=== R&B Album of the year ===
- **The Eminem Show**, Eminem
- Ashanti, Ashanti
- Nellyville, Nelly
- Word of Mouf, Ludacris

=== Billboard 200 Album of the year ===
- **The Eminem Show, Eminem**
- Weathered, Creed
- Nellyville, Nelly
- M!ssundaztood, P!nk

=== Century Award ===
- **Annie Lennox**

=== Female R&B/Hip-Hop Artist of the year ===
- **Ashanti**
- Faith Evans
- Aaliyah
- Mary J. Blige

=== Country Songs Artist of the year ===
- **Toby Keith**
- Garth Brooks
- Alan Jackson
- Tim McGraw

=== R&B/Hip-Hop Songs Artist of the year ===
- **Ashanti**
- Nelly
- Usher
- Aaliyah

=== Artist Achievement Award ===
- **Cher**

=== 200 Album Group of the year ===
- **Creed**
- Linkin Park
- Dixie Chicks
- Nickelback

=== Modern Rock Artist of the year ===
- **Puddle of Mudd**
- System of a Down
- Incubus
- Hoobastank

=== New R&B/Hip-Hop Artist of the year ===
- **Ashanti**
- Tweet
- Clipse
- B2K

=== Modern Rock Track of the year ===
- **Blurry**, Puddle of Mudd
- By the Way, Red Hot Chili Peppers,
- The Middle, Jimmy Eat World
- In the End, Linkin Park

=== New Pop Artist of the year ===
- **Ashanti**
- Vanessa Carlton
- Avril Lavigne
- The Calling

=== Hot 100 Singles Male Artist of the year ===
- **Usher**
- Ja Rule
- Eminem
- Nelly

=== Hot 100 Singles Artist of the year ===
- **Ashanti**
- Usher
- Nickelback
- Nelly

=== Top 40 Track of the year ===
- **How You Remind Me**, Nickelback
- Complicated, Avril Lavigne
- Wherever You Will Go, The Calling
- A Thousand Miles, Vanessa Carlton

=== R&B/Hip-Hop Male Artist of the year ===
- **Nelly**
- Ludacris
- Nelly
- Usher

=== Electronic Albums Artist of the year ===
- **Moby**
- Dirty Vegas
- Louie DeVito
- Paul Oakenfold

=== R&B Single of the year ===
- **Foolish**, Ashanti
- Halfcrazy, Musiq
- Hot in Herre, Nelly
- U Don't Have to Call, Usher

=== Catalog Artist of the year ===
- **Creed'**

=== Rap Single of the year ===
- **Hot in Herre**, Nelly
- Dilemma, Nelly and Kelly Rowland
- What's Luv?, Fat Joe feat. Ashanti
- Always on Time, Ja Rule feat. Ashanti

=== Catalog Album of the year ===
- **Human Clay**

=== Electronic Album of the year ===
- **18**, Moby
- Dirty Vegas, Dirty Vegas
- Blade II: The Soundtrack, Various Artists

=== Special Billboard Award ===
- **Michael Jackson**

=== R&B Artist of the year ===
- **Ashanti**
- B2K
- Tweet
- Clipse
