= Survivor: Live from Harding Prison =

EP by Zach Williams
- Released: 14 September 2018
- Recorded: Summer 2018
- Venue: Harding Prison, Nashville, Tennessee
- Genre: CCM, rock
- Length: 28:11
- Label: Essential; Provident Label Group
- Producer: Jonathan Smith

Survivor: Live from Harding Prison is a live EP by the American Christian rock musician Zach Williams. It was released on September 14, 2018 on Essential Records and Provident Label Group part of Sony Music. The six-song project totaling 28 minutes, 11 seconds was recorded live in summer of 2018 in the Nashville, Tennessee-based Harding Prison, a facility that is part of Metro-Davidson County Detention Facility (MDCDF) run by CoreCivic, a company that owns and manages private prisons and detention centers and operates others on a concession basis.

About 250 men who are currently incarcerated in Harding Prison attended the live performance in the prison's basketball sporting facility. The EP project was produced in partnership with local non-profit organization, Men of Valor. Each of the project's six songs was filmed and released separately. A promotional video also showed interviews with some of the inmates sharing their own personal testimonies with the video footage released weekly on Williams' YouTube channel. The set included the performance of "No Longer Slaves" from Bethel Music originally performed by Jonathan David & Melissa Helser and his own songs "Survivor" (new single and title track from the EP), "Old Church Choir", "To the Table", "Fear Is a Liar" and as finale his 2016 award winning debut single "Chain Breaker" in which the prisoners join in singing.

== Reception ==
Matt Conner wrote in CCM Magazine: "The singer-songwriter has captivated millions with a straightforward series of gospel-centric singles aimed at bringing freedom and hope to those downtrodden or lost in sin’s struggles. Those are messages that resonate well in any environment, but on Survivor, the songs take on new meaning and depth. Hearing "No Longer Slaves" or "To the Table" played for such an audience reveals the personal places we're all held captive while we also consider the rather short distance between each of us when all is said and done. While Williams' live performance at Harding Prison was undoubtedly a gift for the 250 men in attendance, it remains just as meaningful for those of us who hear it outside those walls."

Jesus Freak Hideout, a well-known blog gave it 4 stars but laments in its review the fact that it was just an EP: "There has not been, in the annals of Christian music, a prison album in the vein of Johnny Cash's iconic Live at Folsom Prison till now... Many artists of faith (and otherwise) play music in prisons and jails, but as a document of this act, it's not such a common thing. Zach Williams is exactly the artist to right this wrong. His gritty, no-nonsense, blue collar Gospel rock and roll is the sort that translates directly into the lives of those who most need to hear the good news of Jesus. Alas, at only six songs, the EP is over much too soon. With a few more traditional hymns or Gospel songs, he would have a classic album on his hands". The site adds: "No Longer Slaves" is a powerful worship song in its own right, but sung against the backdrop of incarceration, it gains a poignancy of metaphor and message. To hear the inmates singing along at the end of the song is a transcendent moment. "Fear Is a Liar" and the ending "Chain Breaker" are both likewise poignant moments when considering the venue of the concert."

== Context ==
Having been involved in prison ministry over the years, Williams said he always wanted to do such a musical project inside a prison. "A little over five years ago, I visited a prison in Arkansas with my wife and shared the story of what God was doing in our lives. What I experienced that day is something I will never forget. God broke my heart for these men and women. They had, ultimately, just made bad decisions which is something that I completely related to, and for me, that experience gave a whole new meaning to the word ‘grace.’ He says: "Ever since then, he felt a calling to share my music and stories with men and women in prison in the hopes that lives can be changed by the power of the Gospel" adding: "As a songwriter, seeing God use the songs I write and my experiences to show His grace to others is one of the biggest blessings I have ever received."

== Charts ==
The EP peaked at No. 26 on the Top Christian Albums Chart. It peaked at No. 34 on the Rock Album Sales chart, and at No. 12 on the Americana/Folk Album Sales chart. The EP did not enter the Billboard 200, but peaked at number 96 on the Top Current Albums chart

== Track listing ==
Survivor: Live from Harding Prison track listing
| No. | Title | Writers | Length |
|---|---|---|---|
| 1. | "Survivor" | Brian Fowler, Jonathan Smith, Zach Williams | 4:00 |
| 2. | "Old Church Choir" | Colby Wedgeworth, Ethan Hulse, Zach Williams | 3:41 |
| 3. | "To the Table" | Jonathan Smith, Tony Wood, Zach Williams | 5:18 |
| 4. | "No Longer Slaves" | Brian Johnson (20), Joel Case, Jonathan David Helser | 6:29 |
| 5. | "Fear Is a Liar" | Jason Ingram, Jonathan Smith, Zach Williams | 4:35 |
| 6. | "Chain Breaker" | Jonathan Smith, Mia Fieldes, Zach Williams | 4:08 |

== Personnel ==
- Zach Williams – lead vocals, acoustic guitar
- Brandon Robold – bass, backing vocals
- Nick Mayer – electric guitar, acoustic guitar, backing vocals
- Don Eanes – keyboards, organ
- Travis Toy – pedal steel guitar
- Zach Ingle – resonator guitar, pedal steel guitar, mandolin
- Logan Phillips – drums, percussion
- Jonathan Smith – producer
- Recording – Carter Luckett, Cole Vogel, Joe Hutchinson, Oliver Long, Russ Long
