= Counting My Blessings =

Studio album by Seph Schlueter
- Released: July 11, 2025
- Recorded: 2023–2025
- Genres: Pop/rock; worship; AC/Inspo; Christian/gospel
- Labels: Provident Label Group; Sony Music Entertainment; Essential Records
- Producers: David Spencer; Jonathan Smith; Colby Wedgeworth; Jordan Sapp; Tedd T; Sajan Nauriyal; Cristina Cárdenas; Emma Pettyjohn; Kenzie McCarter

Seph Schlueter chronology
Counting My Blessings EP (2024)	Counting My Blessings (2025)	Fingerprints (2027)

Singles from Counting My Blessings
- 1. "Counting My Blessings" Released: July 28, 2023; 2. "Stay" Released: February 2, 2024; 3. "Stay (Gonna Be Okay)" Released: November 22, 2024; 4. "Words We'll Sing Forever" Released: January 10, 2025; 5. "Turn It to Praise" Released: March 21, 2025

Alternative cover
- Counting My Blessings EP

Counting My Blessings is the major label debut studio album by American singer-songwriter Seph Schlueter, released on July 11, 2025, via Provident Label Group, Sony Music Entertainment, and Essential Records. The album was produced by David Spencer, Jonathan Smith, Colby Wedgeworth, Jordan Sapp, Tedd T, Sajan Nauriyal, Cristina Cardenas, Emma Pettyjohn, and Kenzie McCarter. It features guest appearances from Matt Maher and Essential Worship.

== Release and promotion ==
In preparation for the album, Schlueter anticipated releasing one-to-two songs per year from the album.

On July 28, 2023, "Counting My Blessings" was released as the lead single from the album. The song also served as the album's title track. "Counting My Blessings" achieved significant success, topping four Christian charts, including the Billboard Christian Airplay, Christian AC Airplay, Christian Digital Song Sales, and the UK Cross Rhythms. On the Hot Christian Songs chart, the song hit No. 2. In March 2025, the song was certified gold by the Recording Industry Association of America. On social media, the song received 12 billion views and 112 million streams on DSPs. On November 9, 2023, a Portuguese recording of the song was released by Isadora Pompeo, which went to No. 9 on the Billboard Brasil Hot 100. The song was certified 2× Diamond by Pro-Música Brasil.

"Stay" was released on February 2, 2024, as the album's second single. On March 15, 2024, Schlueter released the Counting My Blessings extended play, featuring eight songs which were featured on the full album. The extended play peaked at No. 17 on the Billboard Top Christian Albums.

"Stay (Gonna Be Okay)" was released on November 22, 2024, as the third single from Counting My Blessings. The song was No. 48 on the Billboard Hot Christian Songs. On January 10, 2025, Schlueter released the album's fourth single, "Words We'll Sing Forever". The fifth single, "Turn It to Praise", was released on March 21, and a promotional single, "Won't Start Now", was released on May 16.

== Writing and production ==
Schlueter spoke about the inspiration behind the album, saying that,

This entire project is an invitation. It's for anyone who's ever doubted if they’re loved, if they’re seen. It's a reminder that there is a Father who loves you, a Son who died for you, and a Spirit who wants to dwell within you. That truth has changed my life, and I hope these songs help others experience that too.

He also stated,

There is a Father who loves you, a Son who died for you, and a Spirit who wants to dwell within you. That truth has changed my life, and I hope these songs help others experience that too.

Counting My Blessings was produced by David Spencer, Jonathan Smith, Colby Wedgeworth, Jordan Sapp, Tedd T, Sajan Nauriyal, Cristina Cárdenas, Emma Pettyjohn, and Kenzie McCarter. It was recorded by Schlueter with writing credits from Schlueter, Spencer, Scott Cash, Ran Jackson, Micah Kuiper, Wedgeworth, Jonathan Gamble, Jacob Sooter, Sapp, Ethan Hulse, and Mitch Wong. Tyler Medows was the album's executive producer. Adam Turley, Doug Weier, Sapp, Kent Hooper, and Sean Moffitt were mixing engineers while Hooper and Bob Boyd mastered.

The album features publishing credits by Sephame Street Publishing, Be Essential Songs, All Essential Music, Dave's Fresh Kicks, Songs From Richmond Park, StereoVision Publishing, Just When Publishing, and Hulse House Music. Essential Music Publishing LLC provided music administrative services.

== Tours ==
In support of the album, Schlueter launched his first headlining tour, the Counting My Blessings Tour, beginning April 2025.

== Accolades ==
The lead single, and title track, of the album, received several award recognitions. At the 2024 Billboard Music Awards, the song was nominated for Top Christian Song. That year, the song was also nominated for Pop/Contemporary Recorded Song of the Year at the GMA Dove Awards. It won Breakout Single of the Year at the K-Love Fan Awards. In March 2025, the song was certified gold by the Recording Industry Association of America.

Awards and nominations
Year	Organization	Nominee / work	Award	Result	Ref
2024	Billboard Music Awards	"Counting My Blessings"	Top Christian Song	Nominated	
2024	GMA Dove Awards	"Counting My Blessings"	Pop/Contemporary Recorded Song of the Year	Nominated	
2024	K-Love Fan Awards	"Counting My Blessings"	Breakout Single of the Year	Won	
2025	GMA Dove Awards	"Counting My Blessings"	Song of the Year	Nominated	
2026	GMA Dove Awards	Counting My Blessings	Pop/Contemporary Album of the Year	Pending	

Year-end lists
Publication	Accolade	Rank	Ref.
New Release Today	Top 10 Worship Albums of 2025	Unordered	

== Commercial performance ==
Counting My Blessings featured three charting songs. The lead single and title track of the album, "Counting My Blessings", performed significantly chart-wise, topping four Christian charts, including the Billboard Christian Airplay, Christian AC Airplay, Christian Digital Song Sales, and the UK Cross Rhythms. On the Hot Christian Songs chart, the song hit No. 2. On the year end charts of 2024, the song hit No. 17 on the UK Cross Rhythms. On the Hot Christian Songs, the song hit No. 5, and on the Christian Airplay, the song hit No. 2.

Although not released as a single, the song "Running Back to You" charted significantly. On the Hot Christian Songs, the song peaked at No. 6. On Christian Airplay, it hit No. 1, and on Christian AC Airplay, it hit No. 2. The album's third single, "Stay (Gonna Be Okay)" charted at No. 48 on the Hot Christian Songs.

The album itself charted at No. 7 on the Billboard Top Christian Albums.

== Music style ==
"Counting My Blessings"
"Counting My Blessings", the album's title track, demonstrates an acclaimed "organic pop" sound.

Counting My Blessings reflects the genres of Christian contemporary, pop/rock, worship, AC/Inspo, and folk-rock, with inspiration from musicians such as Lewis Capaldi, Benson Boone, Ed Sheeran, Rich Mullins and Matt Maher. The album's lyrics have been favored for being relatable and hopeful. Jasmine Patterson of NewReleaseToday described the album, calling it, "an energetic, joyful, album of anthems that make the perfect soundtrack for a drive on a sunny day", comparing the style to Phil Wickham, Benjamin Hastings, and Tasha Layton.

Writers for Provident Label Group considered the album's style to be "a bright, Ed Sheeran-esque collection of songs filled with Seph's organic pop sensibilities and relatable lyrics that speak to his all-consuming love for Jesus" The magazine WorshipLeader praised Schlueter's style as "organic pop". K-Love's Lindsay Williams referred to the album as "raw" and "real".

The album's lyrics have been acclaimed as relatable, described as a "pop-fueled letter of thanks to a God who never fails." Louder Than the Music credited the album for having honest lyrics.

== Track listing ==
Digital release
No.	Title	Writer(s)	Length
1.	"Turn It To Praise"	David Spencer; Scott Cash; Seph Schlueter	3:38
2.	"Steady Love"	Ran Jackson; Seph Schlueter; Micah Kuiper	3:10
3.	"Won't Start Now"	Colby Wedgeworth; Jonathan Gamble; Seph Schlueter	3:13
4.	"Running Back to You"	Jacob Sooter; Seph Schlueter	3:24
5.	"Counting My Blessings"	Jonathan Gamble; Jordan Sapp; Seph Schlueter	3:30
6.	"Stay"	Colby Wedgeworth; Seph Schlueter	3:48
7.	"This Side of Heaven"	Carter Frodge; Matt Armstrong; Seph Schlueter	4:04
8.	"Love Me Still"	Colby Wedgeworth; Ethan Hulse; Seph Schlueter	3:56
9.	"Never Known"	Colby Wedgeworth; Seph Schlueter	3:59
10.	"Words We'll Sing Forever"	Jonathan Gamble; Jordan Sapp; Seph Schlueter	4:26
11.	"Come On Home"	Seph Schlueter; Colby Wedgeworth; Mitch Wong	3:48
12.	"Counting My Blessings" (with Matt Maher)	Jonathan Gamble; Jordan Sapp; Seph Schlueter	3:30
13.	"Stay (Gonna Be Okay)"	Colby Wedgeworth; Seph Schlueter	3:24
14.	"Counting My Blessings" (with Essential Worship)	Jonathan Gamble; Jordan Sapp; Seph Schlueter	3:34
15.	"Love Me Still" (with Essential Worship)	Colby Wedgeworth; Ethan Hulse; Seph Schlueter	4:04
16.	"Words We'll Sing Forever" (with Essential Worship)	Jonathan Gamble; Jordan Sapp; Seph Schlueter	4:30
17.	"Counting My Blessings" (acoustic)	Jonathan Gamble; Jordan Sapp; Seph Schlueter	3:27

Physical release
No.	Title	Writer(s)	Length
1.	"Turn It To Praise"	David Spencer; Scott Cash; Seph Schlueter	3:38
2.	"Steady Love"	Ran Jackson; Seph Schlueter; Micah Kuiper	3:10
3.	"Won't Start Now"	Colby Wedgeworth; Jonathan Gamble; Seph Schlueter	3:13
4.	"Running Back to You"	Jacob Sooter; Seph Schlueter	3:24
5.	"Counting My Blessings"	Jonathan Gamble; Jordan sapp; Seph Schlueter	3:30
6.	"Stay"	Colby Wedgeworth; Seph Schlueter	3:48
7.	"This Side of Heaven"	Carter Frodge; Matt Armstrong; Seph Schlueter	4:04
8.	"Love Me Still"	Colby Wedgeworth; Ethan Hulse; Seph Schlueter	3:56
9.	"Never Known"	Colby Wedgeworth; Seph Schlueter	3:59
10.	"Words We'll Sing Forever"	Jonathan Gamble; Jordan Sapp; Seph Schlueter	4:26
11.	"Come On Home"	Seph Schlueter; Colby Wedgeworth; Mitch Wong	3:48
12.	"Counting My Blessings" (acoustic)	Jonathan Gamble; Jordan Sapp; Seph Schlueter	3:27
13.	"Counting My Blessings" (with Matt Maher)	Jonathan Gamble; Jordan Sapp; Seph Schlueter	3:30
14.	"Counting My Blessings" (with Essential Worship)	Jonathan Gamble; Jordan Sapp; Seph Schlueter	3:34

== Personnel ==
Adapted from AllMusic.

- Aaron Sterling – drums
- Adam Turley – mixing engineer
- Allison Marin – strings
- Anna Benton – background vocals
- Andonia Marin – strings
- Avery Bright – strings
- Becca Bradley – strings
- Bob Boyd – mastering engineer
- Brett Killingsworth – drums
- Caitlin Sell – background vocals
- Caleb Dukes – editing, keyboards, programmer
- Carter Frodge – composer
- Chris Strawder – drums
- Colby Wedgeworth – bass, choir, composer, drums, editing, engineer, keyboards, percussion, producer, programmer, strings
- Colton Price – background vocals
- Court Clement – guitar
- Cristina Cárdenas – producer
- Dan Alber – bass
- Daniel Jones – bass
- Dave Curran – bass
- David Ramirez – keyboards, piano
- David Spencer – bass, composer, editing, engineer, guitar, keyboards, piano, producer, programmer, synthesizer, background vocals
- David Szolosi – vocal engineer
- Devonne Fowlkes – background vocals
- Dom Liberati – bass
- Doug Weier – mixing engineer
- Dwayne Larring – guitar
- Emma Pettyjohn – producer
- Emoni Wilkins – choir
- Ethan Hulse – composer, background vocals
- Hutch Deibler – background vocals
- Jacob Arnold – drums, percussion
- Jacob Sooter – composer
- Jacob Thomas Halm – keyboards, programmer, editing, engineer
- Jason Eskrdige – choir, editing engineer, background vocals
- Jeromy Deibler – background vocals
- Joel Sharat – bass
- Jon Sell – background vocals
- Jonathan Gamble – choir, composer, piano, background vocals
- Jonathan Smith – bass, engineer, electric guitar, producer, background vocals
- Jordan Sapp – composer, editing, engineer, acoustic guitar, keyboards, mixing engineer, piano, producer, programmer
- Joseph Sardella – bass
- Justin Richards – guitar
- Kent Hooper – engineer, mastering engineer, mixing engineer
- Kenzie McCarter – producer
- Kiley Phillips – choir, background vocals
- Matt Armstrong – composer
- Matt Maher – engineer, guest vocals
- Megan Woods – background vocals
- Micah Kuiper – composer
- Mitch Wong – composer
- Moiba Mustapha – choir
- Payden Hilliard – drums, percussion
- Ran Jackson – composer
- Sajan Nauriyal – bass, drums, engineer, producer, programmer
- Sam Featherstone – A&R, album artwork
- Scott Cash – composer, guitar
- Sean Moffitt – mixing engineer
- Seph Schlueter – main artist, choir, composer, acoustic guitar, piano, background vocals
- Stuart Gerrard – electric guitar
- Taylor Johnson – electric guitar
- Tedd T – editing, engineer, producer, keyboard, programmer
- The Cox Brothers – video graphic artist
- Toby Friesen – guitar
- Tyler Medows – executive producer, video graphic artist
- Uriah Solis – acoustic guitar
- Wil Merrell – background vocals

== Charts ==
=== Weekly ===
Weekly chart performance for Counting My Blessings
Chart (2025)	Peak position
US Christian Albums (Billboard)	7

=== Year-end ===
Year-end chart performance for Counting My Blessings
Chart (2025)	Position
US Christian Albums (Billboard)	32
