= Dove Award for Song of the Year =

Annual US music award

GMA Dove Award for Song of the Year
- Country: United States
- Presented by: Gospel Music Association
- First award: 1969
- Currently held by: Cece Winans (2022)

Highlights
- Most wins: Jason Ingram (4)

The GMA Dove Awards Song of the Year is one of the two main categories (along with Songwriter of the Year) which have been given since the 1st GMA Dove Awards in 1969. The following is a list of the winning songs and the songwriter(s) who received the award.

== Recipients ==
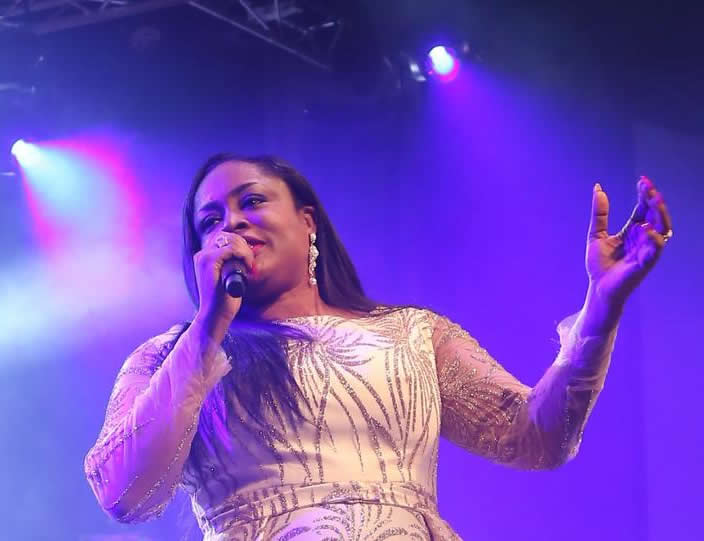
2020 Song of the Year winner, Sinach.

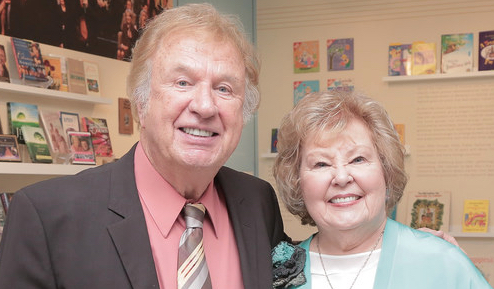
Multiple GMA Song of the Year winners, Bill Gaither and Gloria Gaither.

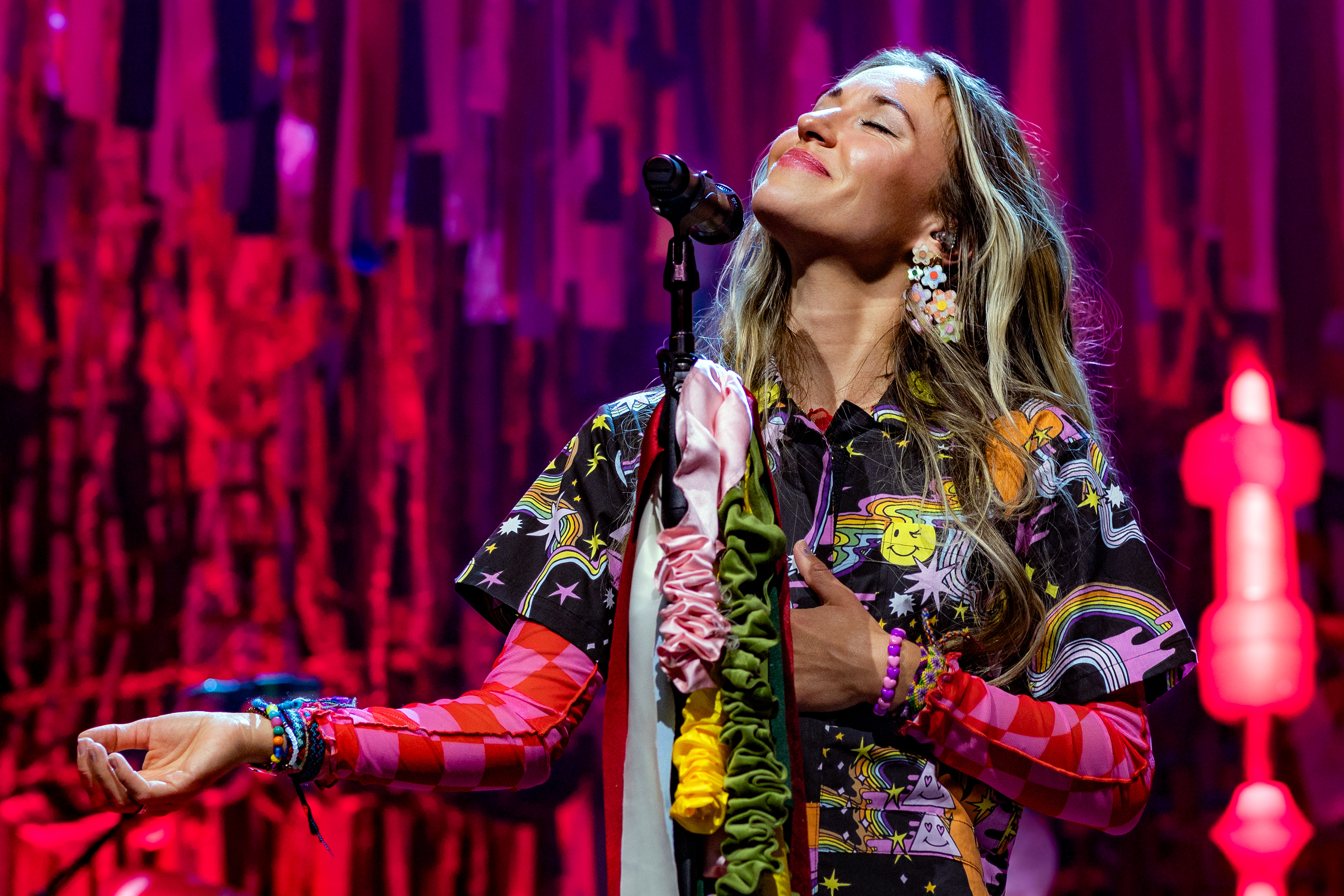
Multiple GMA Song of the Year winner, Lauren Daigle.

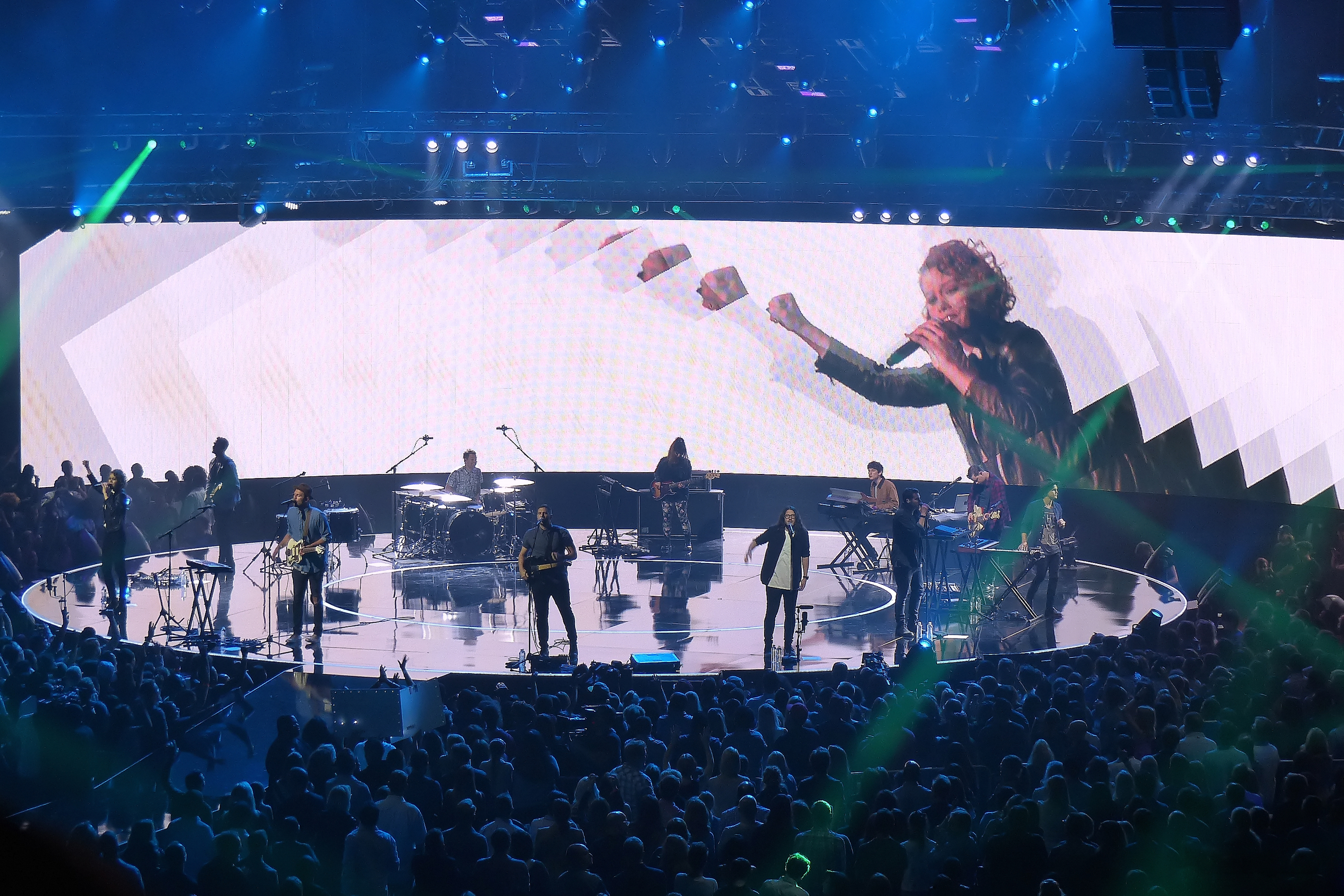
Multiple GMA Song of the Year winners, Hillsong UNITED.

Year	Writer(s)	Work	Nominees
2024	Chris Tomlin Brian Johnson; Jenn Johnson; Jason Ingram; Phil Wickham	"Holy Forever"	
2023	Ben Fielding Ed Cash; Jason Ingram; Jenn Johnson; Brian Johnson	"Goodness Of God"	
2022	Cece Winans Mitch Wong Kyle Lee Dwan Hill	"Believe for It"	“Be Alright”; “Come What May”; “Good God Almighty”; “Hold on to Me”; “House of the Lord”; “Jireh”; “Look What You’ve Done”; “My Jesus”; “Promises”; “RATTLE!”
2021	Chris Brown; Cody Carnes; Kari Jobe; Steven Furtick	"The Blessing (song)"	"Another in the Fire"; "Famous For (I Believe)"; "Graves into Gardens"; "Speak to Me"; "Thank You for It All"; "The Father's House"; "There Was Jesus"; "Together"; "Truth Be Told"
2020	Sinach	"Way Maker"	"Almost Home"; "Burn the Ships"; "Dead Man Walking"; "Deliver Me (This is My Exodus)"; "Holy Water"; "King of Kings"; "Love Theory"; "Nobody"; "Rescue"; "Rescue Story"; "See a Victory"; "The God Who Stays"
2019	Jason Ingram; Paul Mabury; Lauren Daigle	"You Say"	"Counting Every Blessing"; "Everything"; "Joy."; "Known"; "Living Hope"; "Only Jesus"; "Red Letters"; "The Breakup Song"; "Who You Say I Am"; "Won't He Do It"
2018	Cory Asbury; Caleb Culver; Ran Jackson	"Reckless Love"	"All My Hope"; "Blessings"; "Broken Things"; "Control (Somehow You Want Me)"; "Different"; "Hills and Valleys"; "I Just Need U."; "I'll Find You"; "O'Lord"; "Old Church Choir"; "So Will I (100 Billion X)"; "Unfinished"
2017	Ben Fielding; Brooke Ligertwood	"What a Beautiful Name"	"Chain Breaker"; "Come Alive (Dry Bones)"; "Even If"; "Eye of the Storm"; "Feel Invincible"; "Great Are You Lord"; "King of the World"; "O Come to the Altar"; "The Lion and the Lamb"; "Thy Will"
2016	Pat Barrett; Tony Brown	"Good Good Father"	"Brother"; "First"; "Flawless"; "Just Be Held"; "No Longer Slaves"; "The River"; "Touch The Sky"; "Trust in You"
2015	Paul Maybury; Jason Ingram; Jeff Johnson	"How Can It Be"	"Overwhelmed"; "Thrive"; "Hope in Front Of Me"; "He Knows My Name"; "Greater"; "Multiplied"; "We Believe"; "This Is Amazing Grace"
2014	Matt Crocker; Joel Houston; Salomon Ligthelm	"Oceans (Where Feet May Fail)"	"Fix My Eyes"; "Hello My Name Is"; "Hurricane"; "I Can Trust Him"; "Lord I Need You"; "Overcomer"; "Revival"; "Say Amen"; "That's Why"
2013	Matt Redman; Jonas Myrin	"10,000 Reasons (Bless the Lord)"	"All I Can Do (Thank You)"; "Break Every Chain"; "From My Rags To His Riches"; "Greatly Blessed, Highly Favored"; "Hold On"; "I'm Learning"; "Live Like That"; "Need You Now (How Many Times)"; "Not For a Moment (After All)"; "One Thing Remains"; "Redeemed"; "Sometimes I Wonder"; "Take Him to the Place"; "Take Me to the King"; "The Proof of Your Love"; "What The Blood Is For"; "Where I Belong"; "Whom Shall I Fear (God of Angel Armies)"; "Why Can't We"
2012	Laura Story	"Blessings"	"Alive"; "Celebrate Me Home"; "Glorious Day (Living He Loved Me)"; "Hold Me"; "I Smile"; "I've Been Here Before"; "Please Forgive Me"; "Who Am I"; "Your Great Name"
2011	Gerald Crabb	"Sometimes I Cry"	"All of Creation"; "Beautiful, Beautiful"; "Get Back Up"; "Hold My Heart"; "Lead Me"; "Let the Waters Rise"; "Love Came Calling"; "Our God"; "Sometimes I Cry"
2010	Mike Donehey; Jason Ingram; Phillip LaRue	"By Your Side"	"Born To Climb"; "Free to Be Me"; "God Is There"; "I Will Rise"; "Let The Waters Rise"; "Revelation Song"; "Somebody Like Me"; "Two Hands"; "Why Can't All God's Children Get Along"
2009	Brandon Heath; Jason Ingram	"Give Me Your Eyes"	
2008	Mark Hall; Bernie Herms	"East to West"	
2007	Aaron Shust; Dorothy Greenwell	"My Savior My God"	
2006	Chris Tomlin; Jesse Reeves; Ed Cash	"How Great Is Our God"	
2005	Mark Hall	"Who Am I"	
2004	Pete Kipley; Bart Millard	"Word of God Speak"	
2003	Nichole Nordeman; Mark Hammond	"Holy"	
2002	Bart Millard	"I Can Only Imagine"	
2001	Nicole C. Mullen	"Redeemer"	
2000	Michael W. Smith; Wes King	"This Is Your Time"	
1999	Rich Mullins; Mitch McVicker	"My Deliverer"	
1998	David Mullen; Nicole Coleman-Mullen; Michael Ochs	"On My Knees"	
1997	Bob Carlisle; Randy Thomas	"Butterfly Kisses"	
1996	Mark Heimermann; Toby McKeehan	"Jesus Freak"	
1995	Twila Paris	"God Is in Control"	
1994	Shawn Craig; Don Koch	"In Christ Alone"	
1993	Steven Curtis Chapman; Geoff Moore	"The Great Adventure"	
1992	Amy Grant; Michael W. Smith; Wayne Kirkpatrick	"Place in This World"	
1991	Gary Driskell	"Another Time, Another Place"	
1990	Ray Boltz	"Thank You"	
1989	Wayne Watson; Claire Cloninger	"Friend of a Wounded Heart"	
1988	Phil McHugh; Gloria Gaither; Sandi Patti Helvering	"In the Name of the Lord"	
1987	Dick Tunney; Melodie Tunney; Paul Smith	"How Excellent Is Thy Name"	
1986	Billy Sprague; Niles Borop	"Via Dolorosa"	
1985	Gloria Gaither; Dony McGuire	"Upon This Rock"	
1984	Lanny Wolfe	"More Than Wonderful"	
1983	Michael Card; John Thompson	"El Shaddai"	
1982	Dottie Rambo	"We Shall Behold Him"	
1981	Brown Bannister; Mike Hudson	"Praise the Lord"	
1980	Don Francisco	"He's Alive"	
1978	Dallas Holm	"Rise Again"	
1977	John Stallings	"Learning to Lean"	
1976	Neil Enloe	"Statue of Liberty"	
1975	Marijohn Wilkin; Kris Kristofferson	"One Day at a Time"	
1974	Bill Gaither	"Because He Lives"	
1973	Kris Kristofferson	"Why Me?"	
1972	Ron Hinson	"The Lighthouse"	
1971	Award vacated as a result of 1971 GMA Music Awards scandal		
1970	Don Sumner; Dwayne Friend	"The Night Before Easter"	
1969	R. E. Winsett	"Jesus Is Coming Soon"	
