= Billboard Music Award for Top Christian Song =

Annual American music award

The Billboard Music Award for Top Christian Song winners and nominees.

== Winners and nominees ==
Year	Song	Artist	Nominees
2011	How Great Is Our God	Chris Tomlin	Kris Allen-Live Like We're Dying; MercyMe-All of Creation; Sanctus Real-Lead Me; Tobymac-Get Back Up
2012	Blessings	Laura Story	Matthew West-Strong Enough; Mandisa-Stronger; Casting Crowns-Glorious Day (Living He Loved Me); Jamie Grace feat. tobyMac-Hold Me
2013	10,000 Reasons (Bless the Lord)	Matt Redman	Big Daddy Weave-Redeemed; Building 429-Where I Belong; Newsboys-God's Not Dead (Like a Lion); Tobymac-Me Without You
2014	Hello, My Name Is	Matthew West	Building 429-We Won't Be Shaken; Mandisa-Overcomer; Sidewalk Prophets-Help Me Find It; Chris Tomlin-Whom Shall I Fear (God of Angel Armies)
2015	Something in the Water	Carrie Underwood	Francesca Battistelli-He Knows My Name; Hillsong United-Oceans (Where Feet May Fail); MercyMe-Greater; Newsboys-We Believe
2016	"Oceans (Where Feet May Fail)"	Hillsong United	Hillsong United-Touch the Sky; MercyMe-Flawless; Needtobreathe feat. Gavin Degraw-Brother; Chris Tomlin-Good Good Father
2017	"Thy Will"	Hillary Scott & the Family	Lauren Daigle-"Trust in You"; Ryan Stevenson-"Eye of the Storm"; Skillet-"Feel Invincible"; Zach Williams-"Chain Breaker"
2018	"What a Beautiful Name"	Hillsong Worship	Elevation Worship-"O Come to the Altar"; Lecrae featuring Tori Kelly-"I'll Find You"; MercyMe-"Even If"; Zach Williams-"Old Church Choir"
2019	"You Say"	Lauren Daigle	"Reckless Love" – Cory Asbury "joy." – for KING & COUNTRY "Who You Say I Am" – Hillsong Worship "Known" – Tauren Wells
2020	"God Only Knows"	for KING & COUNTRY	Bethel Music – "Raise a Hallelujah"; Casting Crowns – "Nobody"; Lauren Daigle – "Rescue"; Kanye West – "Follow God
2021	"Graves into Gardens"	Elevation Worship (featuring Brandon Lake)	For King & Country, Kirk Franklin & Tori Kelly – "Together"; Kari Jobe, Cody Carnes, & Elevation Worship – "The Blessing (Live)"; Tauren Wells ft. Jenn Johnson – "Famous For (I Believe)"; Zach Williams & Dolly Parton – "There Was Jesus"
2022	"Hurricane"	Ye	Anne Wilson–"My Jesus"; Ye–"Moon"; Ye–"Off the Grid"; Ye–"Praise God"
2023	"Gratitude"	Brandon Lake	Chris Tomlin–"Holy Forever"; For King & Country with Jordin Sparks–"Love Me Like I Am"; Lauren Daigle–"Thank God I Do"; Phil Wickham–"This Is Our God"
2024	"Praise"	Elevation Worship (featuring Brandon Lake, Chris Brown & Chandler Moore)	Forrest Frank–"Good Day"; Josiah Queen–"The Prodigal"; Seph Schlueter–"Counting My Blessings"; Tauren Wells with We the Kingdom & Davies–"Take It All Back"

== Multiple nominations ==
Three nominations

- Chris Tomlin
- MercyMe
- TobyMac

Two nominations

- Tori Kelly
- EMINEM
- EMINEM
- EMINEM
- the Newsboys
- Zach Williams
