= Counting My Blessings (song) =

Single by Seph Schlueter

from the album Counting My Blessings
- Released: July 28, 2023
- Length: 3:30
- Label: Provident Label Group; Sony Music Entertainment
- Songwriters: Jonathan Gamble; Jordan Sapp; Seph Schlueter
- Producer: Jordan Sapp

Seph Schlueter singles chronology
"Rest In Peace" (2021)	"Counting My Blessings" (2023)	"Stay" (2024)

"Counting My Blessings" is a single by American singer-songwriter Seph Schlueter, released on July 28, 2023, through Provident Label Group and Sony Music Entertainment. The song topped the Billboard Christian Airplay and Christian AC Airplay charts, as well as peaking at No. 2 on the Hot Christian Songs, marking Schlueter's first No. 1 hit. In 2024, the song won at the K-Love Fan Awards for Breakout Single of the Year. At the 2024 GMA Dove Awards, it was nominated for Pop/Contemporary Recorded Song of the Year. In March 2025, the song was certified gold by the Recording Industry Association of America.

== Cover in Portuguese ==
Brazilian musician Isadora Pompeo recorded a Portuguese cover of the song, titled "Bênçãos Que Não Têm Fim", released on November 9, 2023. The song proceeded to be certified 2× Diamond by Pro-Música Brasil, as well as hitting No. 9 on the Billboard Brasil Hot 100.

== Reception ==
=== Accolades ===
At the Billboard Music Awards of 2024, "Counting My Blessings" was nominated for Top Christian Song. That year, the song was also nominated for Pop/Contemporary Recorded Song of the Year at the GMA Dove Awards. It won Breakout Single of the Year at the K-Love Fan Awards. In March 2024, the song was certified gold by the Recording Industry Association of America.

Awards and nominations
Year	Organization	Award	Result	Ref
2024	Billboard Music Awards	Top Christian Song	Nominated	
2024	GMA Dove Awards	Pop/Contemporary Recorded Song of the Year	Nominated	
2024	K-Love Fan Awards	Breakout Single of the Year	Won	
2025	GMA Dove Awards	Song of the Year	Nominated	

== Commercial performance ==
"Counting My Blessings" reached No. 2 on the Billboard Hot Christian Songs chart. The song topped several other charts, including Christian Airplay, Christian AC, Christian Digital, and the Cross Rhythms UK Top 10.

On the year-end charts, the song hit No. 5 on the Hot Christian Songs, No. 2 on the Christian Airplay, No. 4 on the Christian AC, No. 5 on the Christian Digital, and No. 17 on the Cross Rhythms UK Top 10.

== Charts ==
=== Weekly ===
Weekly chart performance for "Counting My Blessings"
Chart (2024)	Peak position
UK Cross Rhythms	1
US Christian AC (Billboard)	1
US Christian Airplay (Billboard)	1
US Hot Christian Songs (Billboard)	2

Weekly chart performance for "Bênçãos Que Não Têm Fim"
Chart (2023)	Peak position
Brazil Hot 100 (Billboard)	9

=== Year-end ===
Year-end chart performance for "Counting My Blessings"
Chart (2024)	Position
UK Cross Rhythms	17
US Christian AC (Billboard)	4
US Christian Airplay (Billboard)	2
US Hot Christian Songs (Billboard)	5
Chart (2025)	Position
US Hot Christian Songs (Billboard)	55

== Certifications ==
Certifications for "Counting My Blessings"
Region	Certification	Certified units/sales
United States (RIAA)	Platinum	1,000,000^{‡}
^{‡} Sales+streaming figures based on certification alone.
