= Seph Schlueter =

American musician

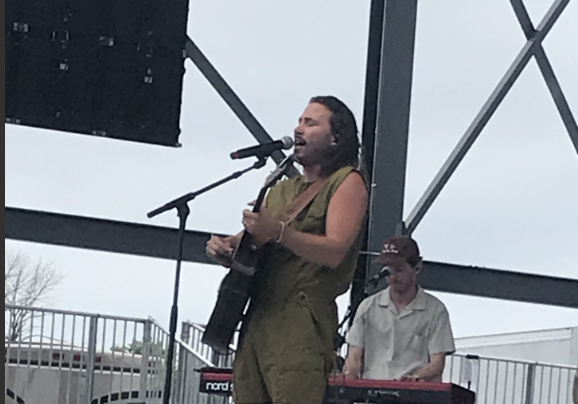
- Schlueter performing at Lifest in 2025

Background information
- Born: Joseph Schlueter; December 18, 1999 (age 26); Erie, Pennsylvania, U.S.
- Genres: Christian contemporary, pop
- Occupation: Singer-songwriter
- Years active: 2019–present
- Label: Provident Music Group
- Website: sephschlueter.com

Joseph "Seph" Schlueter (born December 18, 1999) is an American singer, songwriter, musician, and a leader of the Damascus Worship community, an American Catholic missionary movement based in Columbus, Ohio. In early 2023, he was signed to a deal by Provident Music Group. His song "Counting My Blessings" was No. 1 on both the Billboard Christian Airplay and Christian Adult Contemporary Airplay charts, in addition to being No. 2 on the Hot Christian Songs chart. His song "Running Back to You" went to No. 6 on the Hot Christian Songs chart.

In December on the Billboard Year-End charts, he was the second best new Christian artist of 2024 and listed as the No. 7 Hot Christian Songs artist, the No. 2 Christian Airplay songs artist, the No. 5 Christian Digital Song Sales artist, and the No. 15 Christian artist of 2024.

== Discography ==
=== Studio albums ===
| Title | Details | Peak Chart Positions |
| Title | Details | US Christ |
|---|---|---|
| Counting My Blessings | Released: June 11, 2025; Label: Provident Music Group; Formats: CD, LP, digital download, streaming | 7 |
| Fingerprints | Releasing: March 12, 2027; Label: Provident; Formats: CD, LP, digital download, streaming | To be released |
"—" denotes a recording that did not chart or was not released in that territory.

=== Extended plays ===
| Title | Details | Peak Chart Positions |
| Title | Details | US Christ |
|---|---|---|
| Counting My Blessings | Released: March 15, 2024; Label: Provident Music Group; Formats: Digital download, streaming | 17 |
"—" denotes a recording that did not chart or was not released in that territory.

=== Singles ===
| Title | Year | Peak chart positions | | | | Certifications (sales threshold) | Album |
| Title | Year | US Christ | US Christ Air | US Christ AC | US Christ Digital | Certifications (sales threshold) | Album |
|---|---|---|---|---|---|---|---|
| "Fire Fall // Heaven Rain" | 2019 | — | — | — | — | | Non-album singles |
| "No Distance // Emmanuel" | 2020 | — | — | — | — | | Non-album singles |
| "Rest in Peace" | 2021 | — | — | — | — | | Non-album singles |
| "Counting My Blessings" | 2023 | 2 | 1 | 1 | 1 | RIAA: Platinum | Counting My Blessings |
| "Stay (Gonna Be Okay)" | 2024 | — | — | — | — | | Counting My Blessings |
| "Praise" | 2024 | — | — | — | — | | Non-album singles |
| "Holy Spirit Come" (live) | 2024 | — | — | — | — | | Non-album singles |
| "We Sing (Joy to the World)" (with Leanna Crawford) | 2024 | 18 | 14 | 9 | — | | Non-album singles |
| "Words We'll Sing Forever" | 2025 | — | 29 | — | — | | Counting My Blessings |
| "Turn It to Praise" | 2025 | — | 36 | — | — | | Counting My Blessings |
| "Already On The Way" (with Benjamin William Hastings) | 2025 | — | — | — | — | | Non-album singles |
| "Cling to the Cross" (with Matt Maher) | 2025 | 50 | — | — | — | | Non-album singles |
| "Life With You" | 2026 | — | — | — | — | | Non-album singles |
| "Valley of Worship" | 2026 | 39 | 28 | 30 | — | | Fingerprints |
| "Road Less Traveled" (with Joe L. Barnes) | 2026 | 14 | 11 | 15 | — | | Non-album single |
| "All In" | 2026 | 39 | 32 | — | — | | Fingerprints |
"—" denotes a recording that did not chart or was not released in that territory.

=== Promotional singles ===
| Title | Year | Peak chart positions | | | Album |
| Title | Year | US Christ | US Christ Air | US Christ AC | Album |
|---|---|---|---|---|---|
| "Running Back to You" | 2024 | 6 | 1 | 2 | Counting My Blessings |
| "Stay (Gonna Be Okay)" (remix) | 2024 | 48 | — | — | Counting My Blessings |
| "Won't Start Now" | 2025 | 11 | 1 | 3 | Counting My Blessings |
"—" denotes a recording that did not chart or was not released in that territory.

== Awards and nominations ==
Awards and nominations
| Year | Organization | Nominee / work | Award | Result | Ref |
|---|---|---|---|---|---|
| 2024 | Billboard Music Awards | "Counting My Blessings" | Top Christian Song | Nominated | |
| 2024 | GMA Dove Awards | "Counting My Blessings" | Pop/Contemporary Recorded Song of the Year | Nominated | |
| 2024 | GMA Dove Awards | Himself | New Artist of the Year | Nominated | |
| 2024 | K-Love Fan Awards | "Counting My Blessings" | Breakout Single of the Year | Won | |
| 2025 | GMA Dove Awards | "Counting My Blessings" | Song of the Year | Nominated | |
| 2025 | GMA Dove Awards | "We Sing (Joy to the World)" | Christmas Recorded Song of the Year | Nominated | |
| 2026 | K-Love Fan Awards | "Won't Start Now" | Song of the Year | Nominated | |
| 2026 | K-Love Fan Awards | Himself | Male Artist of the Year | Nominated | |
| 2026 | Dove Awards | Counting My Blessings | Pop/Contemporary Album of the Year | Pending | |
