= There Was Jesus =

2019 song by Zach Williams and Dolly Parton

Single by Zach Williams and Dolly Parton

from the album Rescue Story
- Released: October 3, 2019
- Recorded: 2019
- Genre: Christian; gospel
- Length: 3:43
- Label: Provident Label Group
- Songwriters: Zach Williams; Casey Beathard; Jonathan Smith
- Producer: Jonathan Smith

Zach Williams singles chronology
"Rescue Story" (2019)	"There Was Jesus" (2019)	"Empty Grave" (2020)

Dolly Parton singles chronology
"God Only Knows" (2019)	"There Was Jesus" (2019)	"Faith" (2019)

"There Was Jesus" is a song written by Christian rock musician Zach Williams, Jonathan Smith, and country music songwriter Casey Beathard. A Williams duet with country legend Dolly Parton, it was released on October 3, 2019, as the second single from his album, Rescue Story. It won a Grammy Award for Best Contemporary Christian Music Performance/Song at the 2021 Grammy Awards. "There Was Jesus" received nominations for the GMA Dove Award Song of the Year and Pop/Contemporary Recorded Song of the Year at the 2021 GMA Dove Awards.

== Background ==
Williams wrote "There Was Jesus" with Casey Beathard and Jonathan Smith, who also produced the song. About the song's inspiration, Williams said the song is about "looking back at 20 years ago when I had no idea that God was in the moment, that He was even with me through some of the hard things that have gone on in my life. Now I can see that He had His hand in everything I was doing." He said he knew the moment they finished writing the song he wanted to see if Parton would consider recording it with him. Williams's team reached out to Parton's manager. When Parton heard the song she loved it. Arrangements were made for the duo to meet in the studio a few weeks later to record it. In a press release Williams recalled, "It was a really cool moment, just to have the privilege to record a song with Dolly Parton. Working with Dolly was a true honor. She has a way of making you feel like you are the only person in the room. She is so down-to-earth and genuine, and I can't wait for people to hear that in the song."

== Live performances ==
Williams and Parton performed the song live for the first time at the 53rd Annual CMA Awards on November 13, 2019.

== Accolades ==
Awards
Year	Organization	Award	Result	Ref
2021	Grammy Awards	Best Contemporary Christian Music Performance/Song	Won	
2021	Billboard Music Awards	Top Christian Song	Nominated	
2021	GMA Dove Awards	Song of the Year	Nominated	
2021	GMA Dove Awards	Pop/Contemporary Recorded Song of the Year	Nominated	

== Charts ==
=== Weekly charts ===
Weekly chart performance for "There Was Jesus"
Chart (2019–2020)	Peak position
US Bubbling Under Hot 100 (Billboard)	8
US Christian AC (Billboard)	1
US Christian Airplay (Billboard)	1
US Digital Song Sales (Billboard)	29
US Hot Christian Songs (Billboard)	2

Chart (2026)	Peak position
US Digital Song Sales (Billboard)	11
US Hot Christian Songs (Billboard)	5

=== Year-end charts ===
2020 year-end chart performance for "There Was Jesus"
Chart (2020)	Position
US (WAY-FM)	1
US Christian AC (Billboard)	7
US Christian Airplay (Billboard)	8
US Hot Christian Songs (Billboard)	5
Chart (2021)	Position
US Hot Christian Songs (Billboard)	63

== Certifications ==
Region	Certification	Certified units/sales
United States (RIAA)	2× Platinum	2,000,000^{‡}
^{‡} Sales+streaming figures based on certification alone.
