= Ever Be =

2015 song by Bethel Music and Kalley Heiligenthal

Song by Bethel Music and Kalley Heiligenthal

from the album We Will Not Be Shaken (Live)
- Released: January 26, 2015
- Recorded: 2014
- Genre: Contemporary worship music
- Length: 5:22
- Label: Bethel Music
- Songwriters: Bobby Strand; Chris Greely; Gabriel Wilson; Kalley Heiligenthal
- Producers: Bobby Strand; Chris Greely; Matthew Wilcox

Music videos
- "Ever Be" (Live) on YouTube
- "Ever Be" (Lyrics) on YouTube

"Ever Be" is a song by Bethel Music and Kalley Heiligenthal. The song was released as the second track on Bethel Music's seventh live album, We Will Not Be Shaken (Live) (2015), on January 26, 2015. The song was written by Bobby Strand, Chris Greely, Gabriel Wilson, and Kalley Heiligenthal.

"Ever Be" peaked at number 22 on the US Hot Christian Songs chart. It has been certified gold by Recording Industry Association of America (RIAA). "Ever Be" was nominated for the GMA Dove Award Worship Song of the Year at the 2017 GMA Dove Awards.

"Ever Be" has been covered by several notable artists such as Natalie Grant, Aaron Shust, Shane & Shane, and Anthony Evans. Aaron Shust's version is the most commercially successful cover, having peaked at number eleven on the Hot Christian Songs chart.

== Background ==
Kalley Heiligenthal shared the story behind the song, saying:

The chorus of this song came first. I was in a prayer room setting for a two hour time frame, and after about an hour and a half we ran out of songs. I thought in that moment about finding a hook that was repeatable, and that's where the chorus came from. The bridge came with relative ease. The verses are where you'll find a lot of personal diving into my heart to set the stage for the rest of the song. The beautiful aspect of this song is that I was being coached on how to write the verses based on the question why to the statement "Your praise will ever be on my lips." For me, it was a beautiful process of learning what the answers were.

== Composition ==
"Ever Be" is composed in the key of D with a tempo of 69 beats per minute, and a musical time signature of 4/4.

== Reception ==
=== Critical response ===
Timothy Yap of JubileeCast described the song as "a turbo-charged power ballad that leaves one breathless with all the high octave soaring notes." In a ChurchMag review, Michael Ernest listed "Ever Be" as one of his album favourites from We Will Not Be Shaken (2015), saying Kalley Heiligenthal's voice is "daring, yet soulful."

=== Accolades ===
Awards
| Year | Organization | Award | Result | Ref |
|---|---|---|---|---|
| 2017 | GMA Dove Awards | Worship Song of the Year | Nominated | |

Year-end lists
| Publication | Accolade | Rank | Ref. |
|---|---|---|---|
| Worship Leader | Top 20 Worship Songs of 2015 | 18 | |

== Commercial performance ==
Following the release of the We Will Not Be Shaken, "Ever Be" debuted at number 22 on the US Hot Christian Songs dated February 14, 2022. The song spent a total of twenty weeks on the chart.

== Music videos ==
The live music video of the song was released by Bethel Music on January 26, 2015, having been recorded at Shasta Lake and is part of the concert film We Will Not Be Shaken directed by Nathan Grubbs and Luke Manwaring.

The official lyric video of the song was released on January 26, 2015, also on Bethel Music's YouTube channel.

== Charts ==
| Chart (2015) | Peak position |
|---|---|
| US Hot Christian Songs (Billboard) | 22 |

== Certifications ==
| Region | Certification | Certified units/sales |
|---|---|---|
| United States (RIAA) | Gold | 500,000^{‡} |
^{‡} Sales+streaming figures based on certification alone.

== Aaron Shust version ==
"Ever Be"
- EP cover

Single by Aaron Shust

from the album Love Made a Way
- Released: February 5, 2016
- Recorded: 2015
- Genre: Worship
- Length: 3:50
- Label: Centricity Music
- Producer: Ed Cash

Aaron Shust singles chronology
| "Unto Us" (2014) | "Ever Be" (2016) | "You Redeemm" (2017) |

Music videos
- "Ever Be" (Live) on YouTube
- "Ever Be" (Lyrics) on YouTube

Aaron Shust released a multi-track EP titled Ever Be on January 29, 2016 in digital format.

=== Background ===
On January 27, 2016, Aaron Shust announced that he will be releasing a new EP titled Ever Be on January 29, 2016, while also publishing a devotional. Prior to that, Shust had announced on December 2, 2015, that his version of "Ever Be" will impact Christian radio on February 5, 2016. The Ever Be EP has three songs: two songs which are produced by Ed Cash (the title track and "Fear Not"), and one song produced by Christian Paschall ("God Evermore"); "God Evermore" being the only song co-written by Shust. Shust spoke about his version of the song, saying:

It's my privilege to help carry the message found in the song "Ever Be." The song's message is that God loves us with an enduring promise to never leave nor forsake. He pledges that devotion with such commitment; like that of the most loyal groom toward his bride.

=== Critical reception ===
Jonathan Andre of 365 Days of Inspiring Media praised Shust's rendition of the song, saying "Aaron's imaging of this fan favourite has been nothing less than powerful and poignant."

=== Commercial performance ===
Aaron Shust's version of "Ever Be" debuted at number 36 on the US Hot Christian Songs dated February 14, 2022. The song peaked at number eleven and spent a total of thirty weeks on the chart.

=== Music videos ===
The official lyric video of the song was released on January 26, 2015, also on Aaron Shust's YouTube channel.

The live music video of the song, recorded in Nashville, was released by Aaron Shust via YouTube on April 7, 2017.

=== Track listing ===
Ever Be — EP
| No. | Title | Writer(s) | Producer | Length |
|---|---|---|---|---|
| 1. | "Ever Be" | Chris Greely; Kalley Heiligenthal; Bobby Strand; Gabriel Wilson | Ed Cash | 3:50 |
| 2. | "Fear Not" | Hank Bentley; Bryan Fowler | Ed Cash | 3:18 |
| 3. | "God Evermore" | Paul Baloche; Fanny Crosby; Aaron Shust | Christian Paschall | 5:06 |
| Total length: | | | | 12:15 |

=== Charts ===
==== Weekly charts ====
Weekly chart performance for "Ever Be"
| Chart (2016) | Peak position |
|---|---|
| US Hot Christian Songs (Billboard) | 11 |
| US Christian Airplay (Billboard) | 3 |
| US Christian AC (Billboard) | 8 |

==== Year-end charts ====
Year-end chart performance for "Ever Be"
| Chart (2016) | Position |
|---|---|
| US Christian Songs (Billboard) | 25 |
| US Christian Airplay (Billboard) | 17 |
| US Christian AC (Billboard) | 18 |

=== Release history ===
| Region | Date | Format | Label | Ref. |
|---|---|---|---|---|
| Various | January 29, 2016 | Digital download; streaming; (EP) | Centricity Music | |
| United States | February 5, 2016 | Christian hot adult contemporary radio | Centricity Music | |

== Other versions ==
- Bethel Music released an instrumental remix of the song on their instrumental album, Without Words: Synesthesia (2015).
- Natalie Grant released her cover of "Ever Be" on her studio album, Be One (2015).
- Bethel Music Kids released their version of the song on their debut album, Come Alive (2015).
- Anthony Evans released an R&B-infused rendition of "Ever Be" on his album, Back to Life (2017).
- Shane & Shane released their cover of the song on their album, The Worship Initiative, Vol. 12 (2017).
