= Chain Breaker (album) =

Studio album by Zach Williams
- Released: December 14, 2016
- Recorded: 2016
- Studio: Blackbird Studios
- Genres: Christian rock; Southern rock; Christian pop; worship
- Length: 36:48
- Label: Essential
- Producer: Jonathan Smith

Zach Williams chronology
Chain Breaker (2016)	Rescue Story (2019)

Singles from Chain Breaker
- 1. "Chain Breaker" Released: May 24, 2016; 2. "Old Church Choir" Released: September 23, 2016; 3. "Fear Is a Liar" Released: January 19, 2018; 4. "Survivor" Released: September 14, 2018

Chain Breaker is the debut studio album by Zach Williams, released on December 14, 2016, by Essential. The album peaked at No. 2 on the Christian Albums chart. The album includes writing from Williams, Jonathan Smith, Mia Fieldes, Ethan Hulse, Colby Wedgeworth, Bryan Fowler, Tony Wood, Matthew Armstrong, Parker Nohe, Jason Ingram, Jeff Pardo, Parker Welling, Hank Bentley, and Jordan Frye.

The album was supported by four singles: "Chain Breaker", "Old Church Choir" "Fear Is a Liar", and "Survivor". The first three singles were all Hot Christian Songs top tens, with the former two being No. 1s.

It was nominated for Top Christian Album at the 2019 Billboard Music Awards.

== Singles ==
On May 24, 2016, "Chain Breaker" was released as the debut single from Zach Williams, along with a lyric video. The song debuted on the Hot Christian Songs chart on July 2, 2016, at No. 45. A music video for the song was released on October 24, 2016. On November 12, 2016, the song went to number one on the Christian Airplay chart. The following week, it went to number one on the Hot Christian Songs chart, becoming his first song to reach the mark. It stayed at the position for nine weeks.

On September 23, 2016, "Old Church Choir" was chosen as the second single for his debut album, Chain Breaker. Shortly after being released to radio, a music video was uploaded on May 1, 2017. The song's lyric video was released on June 9, 2017. It reached number one on the Christian Airplay chart, becoming his second leader. "Old" became William's second number one on the Hot Christian Songs chart, holding the position for one week. "Old Church Choir" clocked its nineteenth week on the Christian Airplay chart, tying Brandon Heath's "Give Me Your Eyes" from 2008. The song failed to break the record, being dethroned the following week by Tenth Avenue North's Control (Somehow You Want Me).

On October 20, 2017, "Fear Is A Liar" was released as the third single, accompanied by a lyric video. The official music video was released on January 19, 2018, with the support of the suicide hotline number. The song broke into the Hot Christian Songs top 10, peaking at No. 3.

"Survivor" was released as the fourth single on September 14, 2018, accompanied by a lyric video. A live extended-play was released of the song and several others live from Harding Prison. The song peaked at No. 3 on the Christian Airplay chart but failed to break the Christian Songs Top 10.

== Release ==
Professional ratings
Review scores
Source	Rating
Jesus Freak Hideout	4/5 stars
The Christian Beat	4.6/5

Chain Breaker was released on December 14, 2016, for purchase on iTunes and Google Play, and for streaming on Spotify, Deezer, Google Play and Tidal.

The deluxe edition of the album was released on September 15, 2017, and included five bonus tracks: "Promised Land", "Home", "Midnight Rider", "Freedom" and "Washed Clean (Live)".

== Track listing ==
Chain Breaker standard edition
No.	Title	Writer(s)	Length
1.	"Chain Breaker"	Zach Williams; Jonathan Smith; Mia Fieldes	3:16
2.	"Old Church Choir"	Zach Williams; Ethan Hulse; Colby Wedgeworth	2:56
3.	"Survivor"	Zach Williams; Bryan Fowler; Jonathan Smith	3:52
4.	"To the Table"	Zach Williams; Tony Wood; Jonathan Smith	4:00
5.	"My Liberty"	Zach Williams; Matthew Armstrong; Jonathan Smith	3:03
6.	"Song of Deliverance"	Zach Williams; Parker Welling Nohe; Jonathan Smith	3:28
7.	"Fear Is a Liar"	Zach Williams; Jonathan Smith; Jason Ingram	4:25
8.	"Everything Changed"	Zach Williams; Jeff Pardo; Jonathan Smith	3:22
9.	"Revival"	Zach Williams; Parker Welling Nohe; Jonathan Smith	3:24
10.	"So Good to Me"	Zach Williams; Jonathan Smith; Parker Welling Nohe	5:02
Total length:			36:48

Deluxe edition
No.	Title	Writer(s)	Length
1.	"Promised Land"	Zach Williams; Jonathan Smith; Mia Fieldes	1:35
2.	"Song of Deliverance"	Zach Williams; Parker Welling Nohe; Jonathan Smith	3:20
3.	"Chain Breaker"	Zach Williams; Jonathan Smith; Mia Fieldes	3:16
4.	"Old Church Choir"	Zach Williams; Ethan Hulse; Colby Wedgeworth	2:56
5.	"Survivor"	Zach Williams; Bryan Fowler; Jonathan Smith	3:52
6.	"To the Table"	Zach Williams; Tony Wood; Jonathan Smith	4:00
7.	"My Liberty"	Zach Williams; Matthew Armstrong; Jonathan Smith	3:02
8.	"Fear Is a Liar"	Zach Williams; Jonathan Smith; Jason Ingram	4:25
9.	"Everything Changed"	Zach Williams; Jeff Pardo; Jonathan Smith	3:22
10.	"Revival"	Zach Williams; Parker Welling Nohe; Jonathan Smith	3:24
11.	"So Good to Me"	Zach Williams; Jonathan Smith; Parker Welling Nohe	5:00
12.	"Home"	Zach Williams; Jonathan Smith; Hank Bentley	3:34
13.	"Midnight Rider"	Gregg Allman; Robert K. Payne	3:58
14.	"Freedom"	Zach Williams; Jonathan Smith; Jordan Frye	3:12
15.	"Washed Clean" (Live)	Zach Williams	5:31
Total length:			54:05

- Track information for deluxe edition verified from the album's liner notes.

== Charts ==
=== Weekly charts ===
Weekly chart performance for Chain Breaker
Chart (2016–2018)	Peak position
US Billboard 200	174
US Top Christian Albums (Billboard)	2
US Americana/Folk Albums (Billboard)	4
US Top Rock Albums (Billboard)	28

=== Year-end charts ===
Year-end chart performance for Chain Breaker
Chart (2018)	Position
US Christian Albums (Billboard)	6
US Rock Albums (Billboard)	83
