= Tika (dog) =

Italian greyhound (2010 or 2011 – 2025)

- Species: Dog (Canis familiaris)
- Breed: Italian Greyhound
- Sex: Female
- Owner: Thomas Shapiro
- Residence: Montreal, Quebec, Canada
- Weight: 7–9 lb (3–4 kg)
- https://www.instagram.com/tikatheiggy/

Tika, also known as Tika the Iggy, was an Italian Greyhound with a large following on social media. She was described as a "fashion icon" and "the poster girl for the dog fashion craze". Her online accounts were managed by owner Thomas Shapiro, who added humorous voice-overs to videos of Tika wearing various outfits.

Tika was on social media from 2016, when she was four years old. Her Instagram account described her as a "gay icon" and the "Kween of Derp". Her extravagant wardrobe had approximately 300 outfits such as capes, hoodies, cow-print polo necks, feathered jackets, colorful trench coats, and yellow sweatsuits. Tika gained popularity during the COVID-19 pandemic. She had more than 1 million followers on social media and appeared in Vogue. She appeared at the Billboard Music Awards in 2021 and at New York Fashion Week in 2022 and 2023.

Tika was based in Ville-Émard, Montreal. Her name is based on the Hindi phrase "Theek hai" (ठीक है), which translates to "alright, well done". She was the subject of the book Tika the Iggy: Lessons in Life, Love, and Fashion.

After the accounts he had created for Tika became popular, Shapiro left his job as a web developer in 2021. Tika "retired" from attending events in September 2025. She died on November 4, 2025, at the age of 14.

== See also ==
- List of individual dogs
