= Zach Williams & The Reformation =

American rock band, 2007–2012

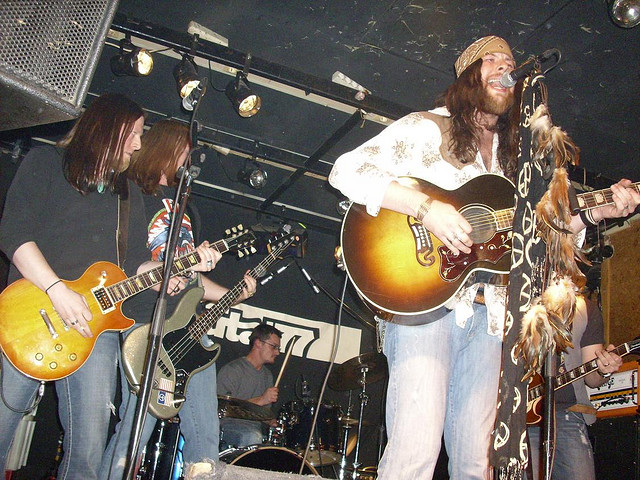
- Zach Williams & The Reformation playing in Madrid, Spain in March 2010.

Background information
- Origin: Jonesboro, Arkansas
- Genres: Southern rock, blues rock
- Years active: 2007–2012
- Label: Independent
- Past members: Zach Williams; Red Dorton; Robby Rigsbee; Josh Copeland; Creed Slater; Barry Fowler; Evan Wilons; John Keathley

Zach Williams & The Reformation was an American rock band formed in Jonesboro, Arkansas in 2007 by the group of Zach Williams (acoustic guitar, harmonica and vocals), Red Dorton (bass guitar and vocals), Robby Rigsbee (slide guitar and rhythm guitar), Josh Copeland (lead guitar, rhythm guitar and vocals) and Evan Wilons (drums). The band took their name from the desire to reform or revitalize the southern rock sound.

== History ==
In 2007, Zach Williams moved in with members of the established local rock band Further Down. While living there, drummer Evan Wilons and bass player Red Dorton heard Zach sing and were blown away by his voice. Recognizing his talent, they helped him curate some of his early songs including "Empty Dreams" and the songs that became the debut album. In February 2009, the band hit Young Avenue Music Studios in Memphis, Tennessee to record their first album Electric Revival. The record was released in May 2009.

Over the course of the year the band toured throughout the region in support of the first album with some of the highlights being a show at Gruene Hall and a show at State Theatre with Hill Country Revue, which consists of several members from North Mississippi Allstars.

In 2009, Zach Williams & The Reformation signed with the Teenage Head Music booking agency from Belgium. In December 2009, the band announced a three-week tour of Europe, including shows in the Netherlands, Belgium, France, and Spain. In the summer of 2010 the band made a one-week stop in both Guam and Japan in support of Armed Forces Entertainment.

In April 2011, the Reformation released A Southern Offering, their second album. In June 2012, the group returned to Spain for a 3-week tour with great reviews, sold-out crowds and a rock-star welcome.

Later in 2012, Williams disbanded the Reformation due to newfound Christian beliefs. He joined The Brothers of Grace, later renamed Zach Williams and the Brothers of Grace. Since 2016, Williams is a solo artist and released the album Chain Breaker on December 14, 2016.

== Band members ==
- Zach Williams (acoustic guitar, harmonica and vocals)
- Red Dorton (bass guitar and vocals)
- Robby Rigsbee (slide guitar, rhythm guitar, and lead guitar)
- Josh Copeland (rhythm guitar and lead guitar)
- Creed Slater (drums and vocals)

== Discography ==
- 2009: Electric Revival (Independent)
- 2011: A Southern Offering (Independent)
