= The Lion's Eyes =

EP by Becca Bradley
- Released: August 7, 2015
- Genre: Worship, CCM
- Length: 26:19
- Producer: Evan Sieling

Becca Bradley chronology
Shaken (2014)	The Lion's Eyes (2015)

The Lion's Eyes is the second extended play from Becca Bradley. Bradley released the EP on August 7, 2015, independently. She worked with Evan Sieling, in the production of this extended play.

== Critical reception ==
Professional ratings
Review scores
Source	Rating
365 Days of Inspiring Media	4/5 stars
Christian Music Review	4.2/5
Worship Leader	4.5/5 stars

Amanda Furbeck, giving the EP four and a half stars from Worship Leader, says, "Becca's experience and passion combine, making this EP a far more polished and developed collection of worship songs than a standard sophomore release." Awarding the EP four stars at 365 Days of Inspiring Media, Joshua Andre states, "Though the EP is quite short, the quality of these melodies is just a good as any other signed or unsigned artist releasing their album this year." Laura Chambers, rating the EP a 4.2 out of five for Christian Music Review, writes, "she pours copious quantities of that illumination on her music, showing us a glimpse of His beauty radiating from within her heart...A mixture of wonder, joy, and light, Becca Bradley’s The Lion’s Eyes has only one shortfall; not enough songs!" Reviewing the extended play from Soul-Audio, Andrew Greenhalgh says, "Becca Bradley showcases a grounded songwriting style alongside some rich, emotive vocals." Timothy Yap, writing a review for Hallels, describes, "if you are looking for a uniquely crafted collection of worship songs performed by a voice that expresses both vulnerability and strength, give this CD a spin."

== Track list ==
Track list
No.	Title	Writer(s)	Length
1.	"Children of God"	Becca Bradley, Evan Sieling	3:52
2.	"People of Light"	Bradley, Nancy Blandford, Stephen Duncan	3:52
3.	"Hope Is Found"	Bradley	4:37
4.	"Yours"	Bradley	6:07
5.	"You See It All"	Bradley	4:43
6.	"The Lion's Eyes"	Bradley, Sieling	3:08
Total length:			26:19
