= We Will Not Be Shaken (Live) =

Live album by Bethel Music
- Released: January 26, 2015
- Recorded: 2014
- Genre: Worship; CCM
- Length: 63:26
- Label: Bethel Music
- Producer: Bobby Strand; Chris Greely; Matthew Wilcox

Bethel Music live album chronology
You Make Me Brave: Live at the Civic (2014)	We Will Not Be Shaken (Live) (2015)	Have It All (2016)

Bethel Music chronology
You Make Me Brave: Live at the Civic (2014)	We Will Not Be Shaken (Live) (2015)	Without Words: Synesthesia (2015)

Singles from We Will Not Be Shaken (Live)
- 1. "No Longer Slaves" Released: August 21, 2015

We Will Not Be Shaken (Live) is the tenth album from California based Bethel Music. The album was released through the group's label, Bethel Music, on January 26, 2015. The album was produced by Bobby Strand, Chris Greely, and Matthew Wilcox, and executively produced by Brian Johnson and Joel Taylor.

== Singles ==
"No Longer Slaves" featuring Jonathan David and Melissa Helser was released as the lead single from the album on August 21, 2015. The song was studio recorded prior to being released to Christian radio.

== Critical reception ==
Kevin Davis of New Release Today said, "On a mountaintop north of Redding, CA, the Bethel Music community gathered for an unforgettable evening of worship. The resulting live album and film portrays breathtaking visuals and resounds with hope. We Will Not Be Shaken presents 11 new songs led by Bethel Music's artist collective, including several debut artists. The accompanying film chronicles the full evening of worship interwoven with honest stories as told by Bethel Music leaders about pursuing authentic community amidst an ever-growing and changing culture. Birthed in a spontaneous moment of worship, the album's title track "We Will not Be Shaken" hails a message of promise amidst adversity and the victory we have in Jesus. The live film powerfully captures the energy and declarations that echoed into the night and invites listeners to join in praise." Christopher Smith of Jesus Freak Hideout said, "Recorded live at Shasta Lake in California, We Will Not Be Shaken is an evening of worship led by the artist collective, Bethel Music. Though artists like Jeremy Riddle and Steffany Gretzinger are missing from this project, the artists that are featured here provide an intimate worshipful environment for these eleven brand new songs. For having nine lead singers, We Will Not Be Shaken is surprisingly cohesive. There are also a handful of artists that make their debut on here on the album, including Kalley Heiligenthal, Hannah McClure, Paul McClure, Jonathan Helser and Melissa Helser. All of these vocalists are relatively talented and help foster the true heart of worship: Jesus. There are even a few points where their passion for Jesus really bursts through, such as at the end of "No Longer Slaves" where newcomer Jonathan Helser cracks his voice out of complete abandonment while singing. Though the artists of Bethel Music focus more on the personal qualities of God, they effectively communicate both these awe-inspiring and fatherly characteristics of God. However, there are several areas throughout the album that seem to lack vulnerability and urgency in our need for Jesus. Even still, most of the songs do have strong lyrical moments, and a few even manage to avoid any problems completely, such as the beautifully penned "Nearness" and "In Over My Head." The music on We Will Not Be Shaken boasts a gentle tone which could be described as a cross between Hillsong and All Sons and Daughters - though not as unique as the latter. Despite the plethora of singers and instrumentalists, none of the songs feel overdone or over performed. The whole album has a magnificently peaceful ambiance that is layered with elegant instrumentation. There are a quite a few things that stand out about this project - the tender tone, the excellent musicianship, and the quality of the singers' voices, but the lyrics could have been stronger and the album's running time could have been cut down considerably." Matt Collar of All Music said, "Recorded live in 2014, Bethel Music's We Will Not Be Shaken showcases the praise and worship ensemble performing in a beautiful mountaintop setting in Redding, California. Showcased here are Bethel Music singer/songwriters Brian and Jenn Johnson, Matt Stinton, Amanda Cook, and Hunter Thompson. Also featured are inspirational contributions from several worship leaders including Kalley Heiligenthal, Jonathan and Melissa Helser, and others. Included are moving renditions of such songs as "Ever Be," "You Don't Miss a Thing," "Nearness," Jesus We Love You," and "In Over My Head."

== Awards and accolades ==
This album was No. 3, on the Worship Leader's Top 20 Albums of 2015 list. The song, "Ever Be", which featured the vocals of Kalley Heiligenthal, was No. 18 on the Worship Leader's Top 20 Songs of 2015 list.

In August 2016, the Gospel Music Association announced the nominees of the 47th Annual GMA Dove Awards with "No Longer Slaves" being nominated for a Dove Award in the "Worship Song of the Year" category. On October 11, 2016, "No Longer Slaves" won the GMA Dove Award at a ceremony held at the Allen Arena on the campus of Lipscomb University in Nashville, Tennessee, with Jonathan David & Melissa Helser performing the song that night.

On August 9, 2017, it was announced that the song "Ever Be" would be nominated for a GMA Dove Award in the Worship Song of the Year category. However, the song did not win the award.

== Track listing ==
Standard edition
No.	Title	Writer(s)	Worship leader(s)	Length
1.	"We Will Not Be Shaken"	Brian Johnson; Bobby Strand; Ben Fielding; Bob Hartley; Chris Greely	Brian Johnson	5:32
2.	"Ever Be"	Kalley Heiligenthal; Gabriel Wilson; Greely; Strand	Kalley Heiligenthal	5:22
3.	"Jesus We Love You"	Paul McClure; Hannah McClure; Kalley Heiligenthal	Paul McClure	6:55
4.	"No Longer Slaves"	Jonathan Helser; Joel Case; B. Johnson	Jonathan David and Melissa Helser	6:13
5.	"You Don't Miss a Thing"	Amanda Cook; Strand	Amanda Cook	7:40
6.	"Seas of Crimson"	B. Johnson; Daniel Bashta; Joel Taylor; Strand	Brian Johnson	5:44
7.	"Home"	Hunter Thompson	Hunter Thompson	4:54
8.	"Nearness"	Jenn Johnson; John-Paul Gentile; Janie Taylor; Robby Busick	Jenn Johnson	5:14
9.	"You Are My One Thing"	H. McClure; P. McClure	Hannah McClure	4:58
10.	"Who Can Compare To You"	Matt Stinton; Strand; Greely	Matt Stinton	5:56
11.	"In Over My Head (Crash Over Me)"	J. Johnson; Gentile	Jenn Johnson	4:58

iTunes Store bonus content
No.	Title	Worship Leader(s)	Length
12.	"Ever Be" (Live Video)	Kalley Heiligenthal	5:34
13.	"In Over My Head (Crash Over Me)" (Live Video)	Jenn Johnson	5:01
14.	"Jesus We Love You" (Live Video)	Paul McClure	6:54
15.	"No Longer Slaves" (Live Video)	Jonathan David and Melissa Helser	6:06
16.	"We Will Not Be Shaken" (Live Video)	Brian Johnson	5:19

== Credits ==
Adapted from AllMusic.

Vocalists

- Paul Arend – backing vocals
- Amanda Cook – vocals
- Chris Greely – backing vocals
- Kalley Heiligenthal – vocals
- Jonathan David Helser – vocals
- Melissa Helser – vocals
- Brian Johnson – vocals
- Jenn Johnson – vocals, backing vocals
- Hannah McClure – vocals, backing vocals
- Paul McClure – vocals
- Matt Stinton – vocals
- Bobby Strand – backing vocals
- Lindsey Strand – backing vocals
- Hunter Thompson – vocals
- Joe Volk – backing vocals

Musicians

- Luke Hendrickson – keyboards
- Bobby Strand – keyboards, acoustic guitar, electric guitar, drums, percussion,
- Matthew Wilcox – keyboards, drums, percussion
- Chris Greely – acoustic guitar, electric guitar, drums, percussion
- Brian Johnson – acoustic guitar
- Michael Pope – acoustic guitar, electric guitar
- Hunter Thompson – acoustic guitar
- Matthew Ogden – bass
- Joe Volk – drums, percussion
- David Whitworth – drums, percussion
- Asher Stanley – cello
- Hannah Jeanpierre – violin
- Allison Wyatt – violin

Production

- Brian Johnson – executive producer
- Joel Taylor – executive producer
- Chris Greely – producer, engineer, mixing
- Bobby Strand – producer
- Matthew Wilcox – additional production
- Ted Jensen – mastering at Sterling Sound (New York, NY)
- Jonah Thompson – monitors
- Kiley Hill – production coordination
- Lindsey Strand – production assistant
- Stephen James Hart – visual worship leader, photography, design

== Charts ==
=== Weekly charts ===
Chart (2015)	Peak position
Australian Albums (ARIA)	14
Canadian Albums (Billboard)	9
Dutch Albums (Album Top 100)	41
New Zealand Albums (RMNZ)	10
Scottish Albums (Official Charts)	49
UK Albums (Official Charts)	34
UK Christian & Gospel Albums (OCC)	1
US Billboard 200	12
US Top Christian Albums (Billboard)	1
US Digital Albums (Billboard)	2
US Independent Albums (Billboard)	1

=== Year-end charts ===
Chart (2015)	Position
US Christian Albums (Billboard)	9
US Independent Albums (Billboard)	19
Chart (2016)	Position
US Christian Albums (Billboard)	35
Chart (2017)	Position
US Christian Albums (Billboard)	38
Chart (2018)	Position
US Christian Albums (Billboard)	40
Chart (2019)	Position
US Christian Albums (Billboard)	43

=== Decade-end charts ===
Chart (2010s)	Position
US Christian Albums (Billboard)	49

== Certifications and sales ==
Region	Certification	Certified units/sales
South Africa (RISA)	Platinum	40,000^{*}
United States	—	30,000
^{*} Sales figures based on certification alone.
