= The Elements (TobyMac album) =

Studio album by TobyMac
- Released: October 12, 2018
- Recorded: 2017–2018
- Length: 40:56
- Label: ForeFront
- Producers: TobyMac, David Garcia, Brian Fowler

TobyMac chronology
Light of Christmas (2017)	The Elements (2018)	The St. Nemele Collab Sessions (2019)

Singles from The Elements
- 1. "I Just Need U." Released: January 5, 2018; 2. "Everything" Released: July 18, 2018; 3. "Scars" Released: September 28, 2018; 4. "The Elements" Released: 2018; 5. "Edge of My Seat (Radio Version) (featuring Cochren & Co.)" Released: 6. "See the Light (Radio Version)"

The Elements is the eighth studio album by Christian hip hop artist TobyMac. It was released on October 12, 2018. It is his fifth album to top the Billboard Christian Albums chart. The album's lead single, "I Just Need U.", peaked at No. 1 on the Hot Christian Songs chart.

== Critical reception ==
Professional ratings
Review scores
Source	Rating
CCM Magazine	4.5/5 stars
The Christian Beat	4.8/5 stars
Jesus Freak Hideout	4/5 stars

Chris Major of The Christian Beat gave the album a 4.8 out of 5, claiming the album is "TobyMac at his best". Jesus Freak Hideout's Christopher Smith praised TobyMac's ability make his musical influences his own, and called the album a "no-filler" and "more mature" album. Marcos Papadatos from Digital Journal called it TobyMac's "most compelling studio album to date". CCM Magazine's Natalie Gillespie praised TobyMac's ability to "blend" many musical styles into the album.

== Commercial performance ==
The album debuted No. 18 on the Billboard 200 and No. 1 on the Christian Albums chart, selling 22,000 units in its debut week.

== Track listing ==
No.	Title	Writer(s)	Producer(s)	Length
1.	"The Elements"	Toby McKeehan, Tommee Profitt	Tommee Profitt, Toby McKeehan	3:52
2.	"I Just Need U."	Bryan Fowler, McKeehan, Blake Neesmith	Bryan Fowler, McKeehan	3:45
3.	"Scars"	Fowler, McKeehan, Cole Walowac	Fowler, Walowac	4:21
4.	"Everything"	David Garcia, McKeehan	David Garcia, McKeehan	3:21
5.	"Starts with Me" (featuring Aaron Cole)	Aaron Cole, Dave Lubben, McKeehan, Walowac	Dave Lubben, Walowac	3:54
6.	"Edge of My Seat"	Fowler, McKeehan	Fowler, McKeehan	3:43
7.	"It's You"	Fowler, McKeehan	Fowler, McKeehan	4:48
8.	"Horizon (A New Day)"	Ryan Edgar, McKeehan, Tim Myers	Tim Myers, Micah Kuiper	3:13
9.	"Hello Future"	Fowler, McKeehan	Fowler, McKeehan	2:42
10.	"Overflow"	Shy Carter, McKeehan, Josh Miller	Garcia, McKeehan	3:16
11.	"See the Light"	Edgar, Sasha Hamilton, Dave Lubben, McKeehan, Anthony Pasqualone, Emma Weisberg	Lubben, Fowler	3:52
Total length:				40:47

== History ==
The Elements is TobyMac's first album since Welcome to Diverse City in 2004 to not crack the top 10 on the Billboard 200, and his shortest by duration, at a mere 40 minutes and 42 seconds.

== Personnel ==
- Toby McKeehan – lead vocals and background vocals
- Bryan Fowler – background vocals, electric guitars, bass guitar, guitars, keyboards, piano, drums, and programming
- Sean Cook – bass, keyboards, and programming
- Cory Wong – guitars
- David Garcia – keyboards, guitars, programming, and background vocals
- Tim Rosenau – guitars
- Michael "DJ Maj" Allen – DJ cuts
- Tommee Profitt – keyboards and programming
- Cole Walowac – programming, additional drum programming
- Todde "Toddefunk" Lawton – bass
- Micah Kuiper – guitar, bass, programming, and background vocals
- Jon Reddick – upright piano
- Josiah Kreidler – guitars
- Dave Lubben – keyboards, programming and background vocals
- NOMAD – guitars
- Keith Everette Smith – trumpet, horns
- Steve Patrick – trumpet
- Tyler Summers – tenor sax
- Barry Green – trombone
- Terrian – background vocals
- Aaron Cole – vocals on "Starts with Me"
- Ryan Stevenson – background vocals
- Blake NeeSmith – background vocals
- Hollyn – background vocals
- Jackson Nance – background vocals
- Gabe Patillo – background vocals
- Jason Eskridge – background vocals

== Accolades ==
Year	Organization	Award	Result	Ref.
2020	Grammy Award	Best Contemporary Christian Music Album	Nominated	

== Charts ==
=== Weekly charts ===
Weekly chart performance for The Elements
Chart (2018)	Peak position
Canadian Albums (Billboard)	77
UK Christian & Gospel Albums (OCC)	6
US Billboard 200	18
US Top Christian Albums (Billboard)	1

=== Year-end charts ===
2018 year-end chart performance for The Elements
Chart (2018)	Position
US Christian Albums (Billboard)	39

2019 year-end chart performance for The Elements
Chart (2019)	Position
US Top Current Album Sales (Billboard)	97
US Christian Albums (Billboard)	9

2020 year-end chart performance for The Elements
Chart (2020)	Position
US Christian Albums (Billboard)	23

2021 year-end chart performance for The Elements
Chart (2021)	Position
US Christian Albums (Billboard)	46
