= 2021 Billboard Music Awards =

Annual American music awards ceremony

- Sponsored by: Xfinity; Hot Tools; Security Benefit; Rockstar Energy Drink
- Date: May 23, 2021
- Location: Microsoft Theater; Los Angeles, California
- Country: United States
- Hosted by: Nick Jonas

Highlights
- Most wins: The Weeknd (10)
- Most nominations: The Weeknd (16)
- Website: billboardmusicawards.com

Television/radio coverage
- Network: NBC
- Viewership: 2.3 million

The 2021 Billboard Music Awards were held on May 23, 2021, at the Microsoft Theater in Los Angeles, California. The ceremony was broadcast live from NBC, and was hosted by Nick Jonas. Musical performers were announced during a series of social media posts.

Nominees for Top Hot 100 Artist, Top Latin Male Artist, and Top Rap Female Artist were announced on April 28, 2021. The full list of nominations was presented on April 29, 2021. The Weeknd received the most nominations on the ceremony, being nominated for sixteen awards, he would win the most awards of the ceremony with ten awards.

Pink received the Billboard Icon Award, Trae tha Truth received the Change Maker Award, and Drake received the Artist of the Decade Award.

== Background ==
Finalists and select winners of the 2021 Billboard Music Awards were based on Billboard charts and reports from March 21, 2020, to April 3, 2021. There were two fan-voted categories; Top Social Artist, and Top Collaboration. Due to the COVID-19 pandemic, no awards were given for any touring category, including Top Touring Artist. The ceremony was sponsored by Rockstar Energy Drink, Security Benefit, Hot Tools, and Xfinity.

Nick Jonas was announced as the host of the ceremony on April 30, 2021. Pink was announced as the recipient of the Billboard Icon Award and the first performer on May 4, 2021. She became the youngest recipient of the award. The award was presented by Jon Bon Jovi. Trae tha Truth was announced as the second recipient of the Change Maker Award on May 13, 2021. The award was presented by Tina Knowles-Lawson. In addition, Billboard partnered with Trae and his non-profit organization, Angels by Nature, to create the awards show's first non-fungible token (NFT). The sales opened during the weekend of the ceremony, and all proceeds were donated towards the organization.

Although country singer Morgan Wallen received six nominations, Billboard Music Awards producers announced that Wallen was not invited to attend the ceremony, due to a video released earlier this year by TMZ of him using a racial slur while with his friends in Nashville. In a statement, the production company also announced that they had also prohibited Wallen from participating virtually or accepting any of his awards for the ceremony, as the conduct did not "align with [their] core values". The company also stated that Wallen's nominations were solely based on his Billboard charts performance. Wallen would eventually win three of his nominations at the ceremony.

Billboard's Top Artists of the 2010s Decade list was revealed on May 11, 2021. Drake ranked at number one, and was honored with the Artist of the Decade Award. Taylor Swift, who ranked at number two overall, is the top female artist of the 2010s decade.

Unlike the 2020 ceremony, which had no audience members in attendance due to the COVID-19 pandemic, Dick Clark Productions allowed fully vaccinated attendees (meaning they would have had their final vaccine before May 6, 2021) to attend the ceremony. Attendees were required to show their vaccination card before entering the venue, complete wellness screenings, have their temperature taken, sit in dedicated audience seating, and wear facial coverings at all times. There was an estimated 500 to 600 people in attendance.

== Performers ==
On May 10, 2021, performers were announced on a daily basis, leading up to the ceremony, via social media.

Performer(s)	Song(s)
DJ Khaled H.E.R. Migos	"We Going Crazy"
Doja Cat SZA	"Kiss Me More" (Note: Presented by Xfinity.)
Twenty One Pilots	"Shy Away"
Alicia Keys	Songs in A Minor Medley: (Note: Medley to celebrate the 20th anniversary of the album's release.): "Piano & I"; "A Woman's Worth"; "How Come You Don't Call Me"; "Fallin'"
AJR	"Bang!" "Way Less Sad"
Pink	"Cover Me in Sunshine" "All I Know So Far"; Medley: "Get the Party Started"; "So What"; "Blow Me (One Last Kiss)"; "Who Knew"; "Just Like a Pill"; "Just Give Me a Reason"
Sounds of Blackness Ann Nesby	"Optimistic" (Note: Pre-recorded from Paisley Park in Minneapolis, Minnesota.)
Karol G	"Bichota" "El Makinon"
BTS	"Butter" (Note: Pre-recorded in Seoul, South Korea.)
Bad Bunny	"Te Deseo Lo Mejor"
Glass Animals	"Heat Waves"
The Weeknd	"Save Your Tears"
Duran Duran Graham Coxon	"Notorious" "Invisible" "Hungry Like the Wolf" (Note: Pre-recorded in London, United Kingdom.)
Jonas Brothers Marshmello	Closing Medley: "Leave Before You Love Me" "Sucker" "Only Human" "Remember This" "What a Man Gotta Do"

== Presenters ==
The full list of presenters was announced on May 21, 2021, via social media.

- Nick Jonas – host, introduced Doja Cat & SZA and Twenty One Pilots
- Lil Rel Howery – presented Top Hot 100 Artist
- Gabrielle Union – presented Top Selling Song
- Michelle Obama – introduced Alicia Keys
- Renée Elise Goldsberry – presented Top Country Female Artist
- Dixie D'Amelio – introduced AJR
- Lena Waithe – presented Top Latin Artist
- Jon Bon Jovi – presented Pink with the Icon Award
- Lil Baby and Nick Jonas – presented Top Hot 100 Song (presented by Rockstar Energy Drink)
- Jimmy Jam and Terry Lewis – introduced Sounds of Blackness featuring Ann Nesby
- Swizz Beatz – presented Top Rap Song
- Tina Knowles – presented Trae tha Truth with the Change Maker Award and introduced Padma Lakshmi
- Padma Lakshmi – introduced BTS
- Drake's friends and family — presented Drake with the Artist of the Decade Award
- Chelsea Handler – presenting Top Rock Artist
- Kathryn Hahn – introduced Glass Animals
- Henry Golding – introduced the Weeknd
- Cynthia Erivo – presented Top Billboard 200 Album
- Priyanka Chopra – introduced Duran Duran
- Leslie Odom Jr. – presented Top Artist
- Kelsea Ballerini – introduced the Jonas Brothers and Marshmello

== Winners and nominees ==
Nominations for three categories for the 2021 Billboard Music Awards were announced on April 28, 2021. NBC's Today Show revealed the finalists for Top Hot 100 Artist live in the Pop Start segment. E!'s Daily Pop announced the finalists for Top Latin Male Artist live during their show. Access Hollywood announced the finalists for Top Rap Female Artist live during their show.

Nominations in all categories were announced during the Billboard Music Awards - The List Live, which was streamed on social media platforms on April 29, 2021. The show was hosted by Access Hollywood's Zuri Hall and comedian LaLa Milan. Finalists were presented by Finneas, Maggie Baird, Luis Fonsi, Jon Batiste, Tate McRae, Anitta, Bretman Rock, Brianne Howey, Antonia Gentry, Chris Sullivan, Jay Pharoah, Kandi Burruss, Kyle Richards, Leslie Jordan, Lisa Rinna, the New Voices Bay Area TIGQ Chorus, Nick DiGiovanni, Paris Hilton, Rob Gronkowski, Tanya Rad, Brad Goreski, Tika the Iggy, Tim Anderson, and Wisdom Kaye. The show also featured reactions from 24kGoldn, Gabby Barrett, and Seventeen. In addition, Hall and Milan discussed the award categories, key finalist chart achievements and records.

Voting for Top Social Artist and Top Collaboration opened on Billboard's official website and on social media on May 10, 2021, and closed on May 21, 2021, at 11:59 p.m. PST.

On the day of the ceremony, Love Island narrator and co-writer Matthew Hoffman hosted an Instagram live on the ceremonies' official account at 10 a.m. PST, where he announced the winners in categories that were not presented during the main show.

Winners are listed first and in bold.

Top Artist	Top New Artist	Top Male Artist
**The Weeknd**; Drake; Juice Wrld; Pop Smoke; Taylor Swift	**Pop Smoke**; Gabby Barrett; Doja Cat; Jack Harlow; Rod Wave	**The Weeknd**; Drake; Pop Smoke; Lil Baby; Juice Wrld
Top Female Artist	Top Duo/Group	Top Billboard 200 Artist
**Taylor Swift**; Billie Eilish; Ariana Grande; Dua Lipa; Megan Thee Stallion	**BTS**; AC/DC; AJR; Dan + Shay; Maroon 5	**Taylor Swift**; Drake; Juice Wrld; Post Malone; Pop Smoke
Top Hot 100 Artist	Top Streaming Songs Artist	Top Song Sales Artist
**The Weeknd**; DaBaby; Drake; Dua Lipa; Pop Smoke	**Drake**; DaBaby; Lil Baby; Pop Smoke; The Weeknd	**BTS**; Justin Bieber; Megan Thee Stallion; Morgan Wallen; The Weeknd
Top Radio Songs Artist	Top Social Artist (fan-voted)	Top R&B Artist
**The Weeknd**; Justin Bieber; Lewis Capaldi; Dua Lipa; Harry Styles	**BTS**; Blackpink; Ariana Grande; SB19; Seventeen	**The Weeknd**; Jhené Aiko; Justin Bieber; Chris Brown; Doja Cat
Top R&B Male Artist	Top R&B Female Artist	Top Rap Artist
**The Weeknd**; Justin Bieber; Chris Brown	**Doja Cat**; Jhené Aiko; SZA	**Pop Smoke**; DaBaby; Drake; Juice Wrld; Lil Baby
Top Rap Male Artist	Top Rap Female Artist	Top Country Artist
**Pop Smoke**; Juice Wrld; Lil Baby	**Megan Thee Stallion**; Cardi B; Saweetie	**Morgan Wallen**; Gabby Barrett; Kane Brown; Luke Combs; Chris Stapleton
Top Country Male Artist	Top Country Female Artist	Top Country Duo/Group
**Morgan Wallen**; Luke Combs; Chris Stapleton	**Gabby Barrett**; Maren Morris; Carrie Underwood	**Florida Georgia Line**; Dan + Shay; Maddie and Tae
Top Rock Artist	Top Latin Artist	Top Latin Male Artist
**Machine Gun Kelly**; AC/DC; AJR; Five Finger Death Punch; Twenty One Pilots	**Bad Bunny**; Anuel AA; J Balvin; Maluma; Ozuna	**Bad Bunny**; J Balvin; Ozuna
Top Latin Female Artist	Top Latin Duo/Group	Top Dance/Electronic Artist
**Karol G**; Becky G; Rosalía	**Eslabon Armado**; Banda MS de Sergio Lizárraga; Los Dos Carnales	**Lady Gaga**; The Chainsmokers; Kygo; Marshmello; Surf Mesa
Top Christian Artist	Top Gospel Artist	Top Billboard 200 Album
**Elevation Worship**; Casting Crowns; For King & Country; Carrie Underwood; Zach Williams	**Kanye West**; Kirk Franklin; Koryn Hawthorne; Tasha Cobbs Leonard; Maverick City Music	**Pop Smoke – Shoot for the Stars, Aim for the Moon**; Juice Wrld – Legends Never Die; Lil Baby – My Turn; Taylor Swift – Folklore; The Weeknd – After Hours
Top R&B Album	Top Rap Album	Top Country Album
**The Weeknd – After Hours**; Jhené Aiko – Chilombo; Chris Brown & Young Thug – Slime & B; Doja Cat – Hot Pink; Kehlani – It Was Good Until It Wasn't	**Pop Smoke – Shoot for the Stars, Aim for the Moon**; DaBaby –Blame It on Baby; Juice Wrld – Legends Never Die; Lil Baby – My Turn; Lil Uzi Vert – Eternal Atake	**Morgan Wallen – Dangerous: The Double Album**; Gabby Barrett – Goldmine; Sam Hunt – Southside; Chris Stapleton – Starting Over; Carrie Underwood – My Gift
Top Rock Album	Top Latin Album	Top Dance/Electronic Album
**Machine Gun Kelly – Tickets to My Downfall**; AC/DC – Power Up; Miley Cyrus – Plastic Hearts; Glass Animals – Dreamland; Bruce Springsteen – Letter to You	**Bad Bunny – YHLQMDLG**; Anuel AA – Emmanuel; Bad Bunny – El Último Tour Del Mundo; Bad Bunny – Las que no iban a salir; J Balvin – Colores	**Lady Gaga – Chromatica**; DJ Snake – Carte Blanche; Gryffin – Gravity; Kygo – Golden Hour; Kylie Minogue – Disco
Top Christian Album	Top Gospel Album	Top Hot 100 Song (presented by Rockstar Energy Drink)
**Carrie Underwood – My Gift**; Bethel Music – Peace; Elevation Worship – Graves into Gardens; We the Kingdom – Holy Water; Zach Williams – Rescue Story	**Maverick City Music – Maverick City Vol. 3 Part 1**; Koryn Hawthorne – I Am; Tasha Cobbs Leonard – Royalty: Live at the Ryman; Maverick City Music – Maverick City Vol. 3 Part 2; Kierra Sheard – Kierra	**The Weeknd – "Blinding Lights"**; 24kGoldn (featuring Iann Dior) – "Mood"; Gabby Barrett featuring Charlie Puth – "I Hope"; Chris Brown & Young Thug – "Go Crazy"; DaBaby (featuring Roddy Ricch) – "Rockstar"
Top Streaming Song	Top Selling Song	Top Radio Song
**DaBaby featuring Roddy Ricch – "Rockstar"**; Cardi B featuring Megan Thee Stallion – "WAP"; Future featuring Drake – "Life Is Good"; Jack Harlow featuring DaBaby, Tory Lanez & Lil Wayne – "Whats Poppin"; The Weeknd – "Blinding Lights"	**BTS – "Dynamite"**; Gabby Barrett (featuring Charlie Puth) – "I Hope"; Cardi B (featuring Megan Thee Stallion) – "WAP"; Megan Thee Stallion (featuring Beyoncé) – "Savage"; The Weeknd – "Blinding Lights"	**The Weeknd – "Blinding Lights"**; Gabby Barrett (featuring Charlie Puth) – "I Hope"; Chris Brown & Young Thug – "Go Crazy"; Dua Lipa – "Don't Start Now"; Harry Styles – "Adore You"
Top Collaboration (fan-voted)	Top R&B Song	Top Rap Song
**Gabby Barrett (featuring Charlie Puth) – "I Hope"**; 24kGoldn (featuring Iann Dior) – "Mood"; Chris Brown & Young Thug – "Go Crazy"; DaBaby (featuring Roddy Ricch) – "Rockstar"; Jack Harlow (featuring DaBaby, Tory Lanez & Lil Wayne) – "Whats Poppin"	**The Weeknd – "Blinding Lights"**; Jhené Aiko (featuring H.E.R.) – "B.S."; Justin Bieber (featuring Quavo) – "Intentions"; Chris Brown & Young Thug – "Go Crazy"; Doja Cat – "Say So"	**DaBaby featuring Roddy Ricch – "Rockstar"**; 24kGoldn (featuring Iann Dior) – "Mood"; Cardi B (featuring Megan Thee Stallion) – "WAP"; Jack Harlow (featuring DaBaby, Tory Lanez & Lil Wayne) – "Whats Poppin"; Megan Thee Stallion (featuring Beyoncé)– "Savage"
Top Country Song	Top Rock Song	Top Latin Song
**Gabby Barrett (featuring Charlie Puth) – "I Hope"**; Jason Aldean – "Got What I Got"; Lee Brice – "One of Them Girls"; Morgan Wallen – "Chasin' You"; Morgan Wallen – "More Than My Hometown"	**AJR – "Bang!"**; All Time Low (featuring Blackbear) – "Monsters"; Glass Animals – "Heat Waves"; Machine Gun Kelly (featuring Blackbear) – "My Ex's Best Friend"; Twenty One Pilots – "Level of Concern"	**Bad Bunny & Jhay Cortez – "Dakiti"**; Bad Bunny – "Yo Perreo Sola"; Black Eyed Peas & J Balvin – "Ritmo (Bad Boys for Life)"; Maluma & The Weeknd – "Hawái"; Ozuna, Karol G & Myke Towers – "Caramelo"
Top Dance/Electronic Song	Top Christian Song	Top Gospel Song
**Saint Jhn – "Roses"**; Lady Gaga – "Stupid Love"; Lady Gaga & Ariana Grande – "Rain on Me"; Surf Mesa (featuring Emilee) – "ILY (I Love You Baby)"; Topic & A7S – "Breaking Me"	**Elevation Worship (featuring Brandon Lake) – "Graves into Gardens"**; For King & Country, Kirk Franklin & Tori Kelly – "Together"; Kari Jobe, Cody Carnes, & Elevation Worship – "The Blessing (Live)"; Tauren Wells (featuring Jenn Johnson) – "Famous For (I Believe)"; Zach Williams & Dolly Parton – "There Was Jesus"	**Kanye West (featuring Travis Scott) – "Wash Us in the Blood"**; Koryn Hawthorne – "Speak to Me"; Jonathan McReynolds & Mali Music – "Movin' On"; Marvin Sapp – "Thank You for It All"; Tye Tribbett – "We Gon' Be Alright"
Icon Award	Change Maker Award	Artist of the Decade Award
**Pink**	**Trae tha Truth**	**Drake**
