= I Just Need U =

Single by TobyMac

from the album The Elements
- Released: January 5, 2018
- Genre: Christian rock; Christian pop
- Length: 3:46
- Label: ForeFront; EMI CMG
- Songwriters: Kevin McKeehan; Bryan Fowler; Blake NeeSmith
- Producers: Bryan Fowler; Kevin McKeehan

TobyMac singles chronology
| "Lights Shine Bright" (2017) | "I Just Need U" (2018) | "Everything" (2018) |

Music video
- "I Just Need U" on YouTube

"I Just Need U" (stylized as "I just need U.") is a song by American Christian musician TobyMac. It was released as a single on January 5, 2018. The song debuted at No. 1 on the Hot Christian Songs chart, becoming his sixth No. 1 on the chart. It spent 30 weeks on the overall chart.

== Background ==
On December 21, 2017, Toby posted a photo on his Instagram page revealing that he was planning on releasing a new single at the beginning of 2018. On January 1, 2018, he officially confirmed the release of the single with a tease of the cover. The song was released on January 5, 2018.

The song is about finding God rather than relying on his own strength. He wrote the song with Bryan Fowler and Finding Favour's Blake NeeSmith. He expresses how important the song means to him in an interview:

"'I Just Need U' is where I land time and time again after my futile attempts to handle life on my own. I am a born defector learning every day that the sweetest place and the only right place for me is turning back and falling into the arms of a loving God."

In another interview with Billboard, he told about the story of the song and how it was put together:

"['I Just Need U'] started in a session writing for the band Finding Favour, but they said it wasn't for them. I thought about [it] and began plowing through my feelings. The world tricks us into thinking certain things will fulfill us, [but] time and again I end up hungry. But when I look to my faith, I begin to find a permanent fulfillment. There's depth and there's soul, which is what you would expect from a seasoned artist."

== Music video ==
A music video for "I Just Need U" was released on March 24, 2018. The visual features Toby driving through the scenic Southern California desert. As of September 2025, the video has over 100 million views on YouTube.

== Track listing ==
- Digital download
1. "I just need U." – 3:46
- Digital download (Capital Kings Remix)
1. "I just need U." – 3:05

== Charts ==
=== Weekly charts ===
Weekly chart performance for "I Just Need U"
| Chart (2018) | Peak position |
|---|---|
| US Hot Christian Songs (Billboard) | 1 |
| US Christian Airplay (Billboard) | 1 |
| US Christian AC (Billboard) | 1 |
| US Digital Song Sales (Billboard) | 31 |

=== Year-end charts ===
2018 year-end chart performance for "I Just Need U"
| Chart (2018) | Peak position |
|---|---|
| UK Cross Rhythms Annual Chart | 19 |
| US Christian Songs (Billboard) | 3 |
| US Christian Airplay (Billboard) | 3 |
| US Christian CHR (Billboard) | 1 |
| US Christian AC (Billboard) | 4 |
| US Weekend 22 | 10 |

=== Decade-end charts ===
Decade-end chart performance for "I Just Need You"
| Chart (2010s) | Position |
|---|---|
| US Christian Songs (Billboard) | 36 |

== Certifications ==
| Region | Certification | Certified units/sales |
|---|---|---|
| Brazil (Pro-Música Brasil) | Gold | 20,000^{‡} |
| United States (RIAA) | Platinum | 1,000,000^{‡} |
^{‡} Sales+streaming figures based on certification alone.
