= Fear Is a Liar =

Single by Zach Williams

from the album Chain Breaker
- Released: January 19, 2018
- Genre: Christian country; Christian rock
- Length: 4:25
- Label: Essential
- Songwriter(s): Zach Williams; Jonathan Smith; Jason Ingram
- Producer(s): Jonathan Smith

Zach Williams singles chronology
"Old Church Choir" (2016)	"Fear Is a Liar" (2018)	"Survivor" (2018)

Music video
- "Fear Is A Liar" on YouTube

"Fear Is a Liar" is the third single from Christian rock artist Zach Williams from his debut studio album Chain Breaker. The song peaked at No. 3 on the Hot Christian Songs chart. It lasted 31 weeks on the overall chart.

== Background ==
"Fear Is a Liar" was released as the third single from "Chain Breaker" on January 19, 2018, accompanied with a music video. The song's message is about maturing with God's love, and coming to the point that there is nothing to fear. The song was written by Williams, along with Jason Ingram, Jonathan Lindley Smith and Eric Pollock.

== Music video ==
The official music video was released on January 19, 2018, on Zach Williams' Vevo channel.

The music video depicts multiple situations where a person is in doubt and fear, while Zach Williams sings in the background.

== Track listing ==
No.	Title	Writer(s)	Producer(s)	Length
1.	"Fear Is a Liar"	Zach Williams, Jonathan Smith, Jason Ingram	Jonathan Smith	4:25

== Charts ==
=== Weekly charts ===
Chart (2018)	Peak position
US Christian AC (Billboard)	2
US Christian Airplay (Billboard)	3
US Christian Songs (Billboard)	3

=== Year-end charts ===
Chart (2018)	Peak position
US Christian AC (Billboard)	6
US Christian Airplay (Billboard)	5
US Christian Songs (Billboard)	7

== Certifications ==
Region	Certification	Certified units/sales
United States (RIAA)	Platinum	1,000,000^{‡}
^{‡} Sales+streaming figures based on certification alone.
