= Everything (TobyMac song) =

Single by tobyMac

from the album The Elements
- Released: July 18, 2018
- Recorded: 2018
- Genre: Christian pop
- Length: 3:21
- Label: ForeFront; Capitol CMG
- Songwriters: Toby McKeehan; David Garcia
- Producers: Toby McKeehan; David Garcia

TobyMac singles chronology
"I Just Need U" (2018)	"Everything" (2018)	"Scars" (2018)

Music video
- "Everything" on YouTube

"Everything" is a song by Christian hip hop musician TobyMac. It was released as a single on July 18, 2018. The song peaked at No. 6 on the US Hot Christian Songs chart, becoming his twenty-first Top 10 single from that chart. It lasted 31 weeks on the overall chart. The song is played in a B minor key, and 112 beats per minute.

== Background ==
"Everything" was released on July 18, 2018, as the second single from his upcoming eighth studio album. On July 25, 2018, Toby shared a video on his Twitter, explaining the meaning behind the song,"I was on my way to the studio one day to write this song, a song I had in my head but not really in my heart. So, on the drive, I said a really simple prayer. I said, 'Daddy, if You want me to write a song other than this one, will You show me something?' As I continued drivin', my eyes began to open and I could hear Him saying, 'Nah, Toby, I'm not gonna show you somethin'. I'm showing you everything.' Isaiah 43:19 says, 'I am doing a new thing in the land. It's springing forth; do you perceive it?' I walked in the studio that day with a fresh song to write. Yep, a new song in my heart. And I'm gonna fight to keep lookin' for God in everything all day."

== Music video ==
A music video for the single "Everything" was released on August 9, 2018. The visual features Toby performing the track around parts of a street in Columbia, Tennessee. One scene with a black car parked in front of a business was filmed in front of Paper Pulleys, Inc. on the corner of Woodland St. and E. 8th St. in Columbia, Tennessee.

== Charts ==
=== Weekly charts ===
Weekly chart performance for "Everything"
Chart (2018)	Peak position
US Hot Christian Songs (Billboard)	6
US Christian Airplay (Billboard)	2
US Christian AC (Billboard)	5

=== Year-end charts ===
2018 year-end chart performance for "Everything"
Chart (2018)	Peak position
UK Cross Rhythms Annual Chart	12
US Christian Songs (Billboard)	23
US Christian Airplay (Billboard)	31
US Christian AC (Billboard)	37
US Christian CHR (Billboard)	19
US Weekend 22	3

== Certifications ==
Region	Certification	Certified units/sales
United States (RIAA)	Gold	500,000^{‡}
^{‡} Sales+streaming figures based on certification alone.
