= Rescue Story =

Studio album by Zach Williams
- Released: October 4, 2019
- Studio: Gnome Studios, Love Shack Recording and Southern Ground Studios (Nashville, Tennessee); Right Path Studios (Brentwood, Tennessee)
- Genre: Christian rock; Southern rock; worship
- Length: 35:35
- Label: Essential
- Producer: Jonathan Smith

Zach Williams chronology
| Chain Breaker (2016) | Rescue Story (2019) | A Hundred Highways (2022) |

Singles from Rescue Story
- 1. "Rescue Story" Released: June 21, 2019; 2. "There Was Jesus" Released: October 3, 2019

Rescue Story is the second studio album of the American Christian rock singer Zach Williams released on October 4, 2019, on Essential record label. The album peaked at No. 2 on the U.S. Christian Albums chart and at 111 on the U.S. Billboard 200 albums chart. The 10-track album includes the title track single "Rescue Story". Three other tracks "Walk With You", "Heaven Help Me" and "There Was Jesus" (the latter featuring Dolly Parton) also appeared on the Billboard Christian Songs chart.

== Accolades ==
Awards
| Year | Organization | Award | Result | Ref |
|---|---|---|---|---|
| 2021 | Billboard Music Awards | Top Christian Album | Nominated | |

== Track listing ==
Rescue Story track listing
| No. | Title | Writer(s) | Length |
|---|---|---|---|
| 1. | "Walk with You" | Zack Williams, Casey Beathard, Jonathan Smith | 3:47 |
| 2. | "Less Like Me" | Williams, Hank Bentley, Mia Fieldes | 3:43 |
| 3. | "Rescue Story" | Williams, Smith, Ethan Hulse, Andrew Ripp | 3:57 |
| 4. | "Stand Up" | Williams, Smith, Fieldes | 3:14 |
| 5. | "Slave to Nothing" | Williams, Smith, Fieldes | 3:36 |
| 6. | "Under My Feet" | Williams, Smith, Fieldes | 3:28 |
| 7. | "There Was Jesus" (featuring Dolly Parton) | Williams, Smith, Bearthard | 3:43 |
| 8. | "Heaven Help Me" | Williams, Bentley, Fieldes | 3:22 |
| 9. | "Baptized" | Williams, Smith, Tim Nichols | 3:24 |
| 10. | "Face to Face" | Williams, Smith | 3:23 |
| Total length: | | | 35:35 |

== Personnel ==
- Zach Williams – vocals
- Jonathan Smith – keyboards (1, 3, 4, 7, 8), programming (1, 3–8), acoustic guitars (1–3, 5–9), backing vocals (1, 3, 5, 6, 8), organ (2), electric guitars (4, 6, 9), acoustic piano (6, 10), Mellotron (6), bouzouki (7), banjo (8)
- Justin Amundrud – programming (1)
- Ian Fitchuk – acoustic piano (1, 5, 7), organ (1, 5, 7, 10)
- Jacob Sooter – acoustic piano (2, 8), Wurlitzer electric piano (2), organ (3, 8), programming (3)
- Hank Bentley – programming (2, 8), acoustic guitars (2, 8), electric guitars (3, 8), backing vocals (8)
- Kevin Rooney – programming (2)
- Dwan Hill – acoustic piano (3, 9), organ (9)
- Chad Carouthers – programming (3–6), electric guitars (5, 6, 8), bass (6, 8)
- Kris Donegan – electric guitars (1–3, 5, 7, 9)
- Danny Rader – acoustic guitars (1), electric guitars (2, 5, 7)
- Nick Mayer – electric guitars (4)
- Taylor Johnson – electric guitars (7)
- Travis Toy – pedal steel guitar (6)
- Tony Lucido – bass (1–3, 5, 7, 9)
- Brandon Robold – bass (4)
- Fred Ettringham – drums (1, 2, 5), percussion (2)
- Nir Z – drums (3, 8)
- Aaron Sterling – drums (4, 7, 9), percussion (4, 7, 9), programming (4)
- Jacob Arnold – drums (6)
- Jimmy Bowland – baritone saxophone (4, 5), tenor saxophone (4, 5)
- Barry Green – bass trombone (4, 5), trombone (4, 5)
- Steve Patrick – trumpet (4, 5)
- Keith Everette Smith – trumpet (4, 5), horn arrangements and contractor (4, 5)
- Luke Brown – backing vocals (1, 6)
- Abbie Parker – backing vocals (2, 6)
- Dolly Parton – vocals (7)
- Mia Fieldes – backing vocals (8)

Choir (Tracks 3–5 & 8–10)

- Nickie Conley
- Devonne Fowlkes
- Ethan Hulse (3)
- Andrew Ripp (3)
- Debi Selby
- Emoni Wilkins (also choir arrangements)

=== Production ===
- Blaine Barcus – A&R
- Jonathan Smith – producer, engineer (9)
- Diane Sheets – additional vocal production
- Joe Baldridge – engineer (1–3, 5, 7, 10)
- Josh Ditty – overdub engineer (1–3, 5, 7, 9), assistant engineer (1–3, 5, 7, 10), engineer (4), choir recording (5, 8–10)
- Ryan Mohr – horn section recording (4, 5)
- Howard Willing – vocal recording for Dolly Parton (7)
- Daniel Davis – assistant engineer (1, 2, 5, 7, 10)
- Paul Rossetti – editing (1, 2, 4, 7)
- Dave Cook – editing (3, 8, 10), engineer (8, 10)
- John DeNosky – editing (9)
- Sean Moffitt – mixing
- Jesse Brock – mix assistant
- Daniel Mikesell – mix assistant
- Dave McNair – mastering at Dave McNair Mastering (Winston-Salem, North Carolina)
- Traci Sterling-Bishir – A&R production
- Eric Brown – photography
- Tim Parker – art direction, graphic design
- Morgan Kozakiewicz – hair, make-up
- Ryan Rettler at Just Management – management

== Charts ==
=== Weekly ===
Weekly chart performance for Rescue Story
| Chart (2018) | Peak position |
|---|---|
| US Billboard 200 | 111 |
| US Christian Albums (Billboard) | 2 |
| US Americana/Folk Albums (Billboard) | 5 |
| US Top Rock Albums (Billboard) | 26 |

=== Year-end ===
Year-end chart performance for Rescue Story
| Chart (2025) | Position |
|---|---|
| US Top Christian Albums (Billboard) | 38 |

== Certifications ==
| Region | Certification | Certified units/sales |
|---|---|---|
| United States (RIAA) | Gold | 500,000^{‡} |
^{‡} Sales+streaming figures based on certification alone.
