= Cristina Cardenas =

Visual artist

- Born: 1957 (age 68–69); Guadalajara, Jalisco, Mexico
- Education: University of Arizona

Cristina Cardenas (born 1957) is a painter, printmaker, and lithographer known for paying tribute to Mexican culture. It has been suggested the imagery of her paintings is "meant to empower women".

== Early life and education ==
Cristina Cardenas was born in Guadalajara in 1957. She moved to the United States and settled in Tucson, Arizona. Cardenas earned a Master of Fine Arts in printmaking from the University of Arizona in 1990.

== Career ==
Cardenas engages in several forms of art including paintings, lithographs, prints, and murals. She also teaches at Pima Community College and works with children at a nearby charter school.

Notable works include Malinche, Coatlicue, y Virgen de los Remedios (1991), a mixed media painting that was part of the Counter Colon-ialismo exhibition. The painting depicts Malintzin in front of Coatlicue, surrounded by La Virgen de los Remedios. The text within the painting reads "Malintzin, India noble, mujer inteligente" which translates to "Malintzin, noble and intelligent Indigenous women." According to Cardenas, this work highlights Coatlicue’s influence on Malintzin, as well as the religion imposed on her.

Also the work titled, La Nina de los Espejos (2005) which is a lithograph at the Scottsdale Museum of Contemporary Art. This lithograph is a part of the “Unapologetic: All Women, All Year” exhibition. It features a girl with long, black flowing hair, and explores the theme of women’s strength.

Her 2004 print Graciela is part of the Self-Help Graphics & Art collection at the UCLA Chicano Studies Research Center.

Her work is held in the permanent collections of the National Museum of Mexican Art, the McNay Art Museum, the Scottsdale Museum of Contemporary Art,and the UCLA Chicano Studies Research Center collection, among others.
