= Becca Bradley =

American musician & cellist (born 1991)

- Also known as: Becca Bradley
- Born: Rebecca Lynn Bradley; May 3, 1991 (age 35)
- Origin: Nashville, Tennessee
- Genres: Worship, CCM
- Occupations: Singer, songwriter, cellist
- Instruments: Vocals, singer-songwriter, cello
- Years active: 2014–present
- Website: beccabradleymusic.com

Rebecca Lynn Bradley (born May 3, 1991), who goes by the stage name Becca Bradley, is an American Christian musician and cellist, who primarily plays a Christian pop style of worship music. Becca released her first full-length album, Heaven Come Down on February 1, 2019. She previously released two extended plays, Shaken in 2014, and The Lion's Eyes in 2015.

== Early and personal life ==
Rebecca Lynn Bradley, was born on May 3, 1991, to parents Mark and Renee Bradley. She was raised with her two sisters, Melissa and Emily, in a musical household, where her older sister Melissa introduced her to the cello. Becca moved to Nashville, Tennessee from Conway, Arkansas, to study music at Belmont University. After graduating from Belmont in 2013, Bradley remained in Nashville to work in music full-time.

== Music career ==
She started her music recording career in 2014, with her first extended play, Shaken, that was released on April 29, 2014. Her subsequent extended play, The Lion's Eyes, was released on August 7, 2015. Most recently, Becca released her debut full-length album Heaven Come Down on February 1, 2019.

== Discography ==
EPs

- Shaken (April 29, 2014)
- The Lion's Eyes (August 7, 2015)
- Heaven Come Down (February 1, 2019)

== Cello ==
As a cellist, Becca landed her first major tour just six months after graduating with her bachelor's in music. Becca has since toured with artists including Michael W. Smith, Lauren Daigle, Francesca Battistelli, Judah and the Lion, Andrew Ripp, Jason Gray, Aaron Shust, and more. She is currently playing with Big Daddy Weave on the Alive Tour alongside violinist Jonathan Chu. Becca has also had the honor of playing in the house band for the CMA Awards and various other CMA events, where she has shared the stage with such notable artists as Taylor Swift, Carrie Underwood, Kelly Clarkson, Keith Urban, Lady Antebellum, Rascal Flatts, Little Big Town, and more.
