= Zach Williams (musician) =

American singer-songwriter (born 1978)

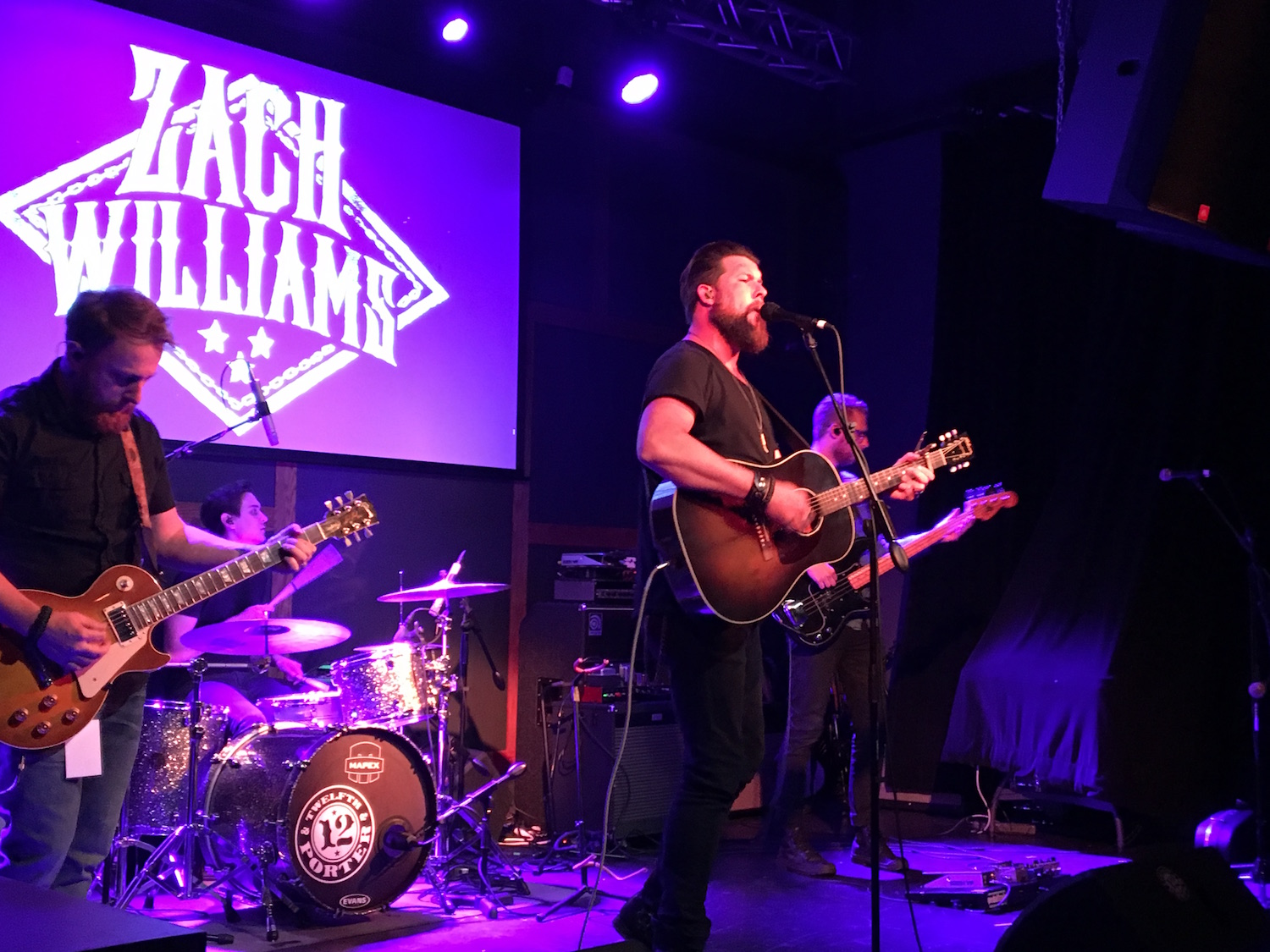

Background information
- Born: Zachary Stephen Williams; June 27, 1978 (age 48); Pensacola, Florida
- Origin: Bono, Arkansas
- Genres: Christian rock; Southern rock; Christian pop; worship; Southern gospel
- Years active: 2007–present
- Label: Essential
- Formerly of: Zach Williams & The Reformation
- Website: zachwilliamsmusic.com

Zachary Stephen Williams (born June 27, 1978) is an American Christian rock singer-songwriter from Bono, Arkansas. From 2007 through 2012 he was lead vocalist and played acoustic guitar and harmonica for Zach Williams & The Reformation. He was also the lead singer of the Christian group Brothers of Grace, renamed as Zach Williams and the Brothers of Grace. In 2016, he went on to a solo career.

== Beginnings ==
Zachary Stephen Williams was born in Pensacola, Florida, on June 27, 1978, but grew up in Jonesboro, Arkansas.

== Music career ==
=== Zach Williams & The Reformation ===
Williams was the lead singer in Zach Williams & The Reformation, an American rock band formed in Jonesboro, Arkansas, in 2007 by the group of Zach Williams (acoustic guitar, harmonica and vocals), Red Dorton (bass guitar and vocals), Robby Rigsbee (slide guitar and rhythm guitar), Josh Copeland (lead guitar, rhythm guitar and vocals) and Evan Wilons (drums). The band took their name from the desire to reform or revitalize the southern rock sound. The band released two independent albums, Electric Revival in 2009 and A Southern Offering in 2011. In 2012, Williams disbanded The Reformation due to his newfound Christian beliefs.

=== The Brothers of Grace / Zach Williams and the Brothers of Grace ===
After Zach Williams and The Reformation disbanded, Williams and guitarist Robby Rigsbee dedicated their lives to Christ and began playing music in their church, Central Baptist in Jonesboro, Arkansas. Church band the Brothers of Grace became Zach Williams and the Brothers of Grace. Shaun Kirby, who had previously been part of southern rock band Further Down with Rigsbee, was the drummer. The group also included Bruce Ford (bass) and Kevin Rouse (keyboard). They independently released an EP, Shine a Light, in 2014.

=== Solo career ===
In 2016 Williams signed to Sony Music's Provident Label Group - Essential Records as a solo artist, four years after Zach Williams & The Reformation disbanded, and released his first solo single, "Chain Breaker", which reached No. 1 on the Hot Christian Songs Chart and the Top 10 on Christian radio. Following the single, Williams released a five-song EP, Chain Breaker, with producers Jonathan Smith and Colby Wedgeworth. Williams also led worship at the Refuge Campus of Central Baptist Church in Jonesboro, Arkansas, where he was on staff from 2014 to 2017.

On December 14, 2016, Williams digitally released his full-length album, Chain Breaker, and announced a release date of January 27, 2017, for the CD.

On October 4, 2019, Williams released his second album, Rescue Story. It includes the single "There Was Jesus", with Dolly Parton.

On September 30, 2022, Williams released his third album, A Hundred Highways. It includes the single "Heart of God". His song "Up There, Down Here", from the same album, was covered by contestant Warren Peay on season 21 of American Idol.

== Discography ==
=== Albums ===
As Zach Williams & The Reformation

- Electric Revival (independent, 2009)
- A Southern Offering (independent, 2011)

Solo

Title	Album details	Peak chart positions				Certifications
Title	Album details	US	US Christ	US Folk	US Rock	Certifications
Chain Breaker	Released: December 14, 2016; Label: Essential; Formats: DL, CD	174	2	4	28	RIAA: Gold
Rescue Story	Released: October 4, 2019; Label: Essential; Formats: CD, DL, streaming	111	2	5	21	RIAA: Gold
A Hundred Highways	Released: September 30, 2022; Label: Essential; Formats: CD, DL, streaming	— (Note: A Hundred Highways did not enter the Billboard 200, but peaked at No. 19 on the Billboard Top Album Sales chart.)	2	9	—	
Jesus Loves	Released: September 19, 2025; Label: Essential; Formats: CD, DL, streaming	— (Note: Jesus Loves did not enter the Billboard 200, but peaked at No. 44 on the Billboard Top Current Album Sales)	10	—	—	

=== Holiday albums ===
List of holiday albums, with selected chart positions
Title	Album details	Peak chart positions	
Title	Album details	US Christ.	US Holiday
I Don't Want Christmas to End	Released: October 22, 2021; Label: Provident/Sony; Format: CD, digital download	46	11

=== EPs ===
As Zach Williams and the Brothers of Grace

- Shine a Light EP (2014)

Solo

List of EPs, with selected chart positions
Title	EP details	Peak chart positions			
Title	EP details	US	US Christ	US Folk	US Rock
Chain Breaker	Released: September 23, 2016; Label: Essential; Formats: CD, digital download	— (Note: Chainbreaker did not enter the Billboard 200, but peaked at No. 11 on the Billboard Top Heatseekers)	20	23	—
Survivor: Live from Harding Prison	Released: September 14, 2018; Label: Provident; Format: Digital download	— (Note: Survivor: Live from Harding Prison did not enter the Billboard 200, but peaked at number 96 on the Top Current Albums chart.)	26	— (Note: Survivor: Live from Harding Prison did not enter the Americana/Folk Albums chart, but peaked at No. 12 on the Americana/Folk Album Sales chart.)	34 (Note: Survivor: Live from Harding Prison did not enter the Rock Albums chart, but peaked at No. 34 on the Rock Album Sales chart.)

=== Singles ===
==== As lead artist ====
List of singles, with year, album, and selected chart positions
Year	Title	Peak chart positions						Certifications	Album
Year	Title	US Bub.	US Rock	US Christ	US Christ Airplay	US Christ AC	US Christ Digital	Certifications	Album
2016	"Chain Breaker"	—	9	1	1	1	1	RIAA: 2× Platinum	Chain Breaker
2017	"Old Church Choir"	—	7	1	1	1	1	RIAA: Platinum	Chain Breaker
2018	"Fear Is a Liar"	—	—	3	3	2	3	RIAA: Platinum	Chain Breaker
2018	"Survivor"	—	—	11	3	4	—		Chain Breaker
2019	"Rescue Story"	—	—	5	2	2	6	RIAA: Platinum	Rescue Story
2019	"There Was Jesus" (featuring Dolly Parton)	8	—	2	1	1	1	RIAA: 2× Platinum	Rescue Story
2020	"Empty Grave"	—	—	41	—	—	19		Rescue Story (Deluxe Edition)
2020	"Go Tell It on the Mountain"	—	—	17	3	2	—		Non-album single
2021	"Less Like Me"	25	—	4	1	1	3	RIAA: Gold	Rescue Story
2021	"Heaven Help Me" (Note: "Heaven Help Me" was released as a promotional single in 2019, prior to Rescue Story's release. It was not released as a radio single until 2021.)	—	23	15	10	11	19	RIAA: Gold	Rescue Story
2021	"I Don't Want Christmas to End"	—	—	—	18	10	—		I Don't Want Christmas to End
2022	"Heart of God"	—	26	6	11	8	1		A Hundred Highways
2022	"Big Tent Revival"	—	—	47	—	—	—		A Hundred Highways
2022	"Looking for You"	—	—	25	30	—	7		A Hundred Highways
2023	"Sunday's Comin"	—	—	29	17	16	—		A Hundred Highways
2024	"Friend in High Places"	—	—	18	—	—	—		Jesus Loves
2025	"Jesus Loves"	—	41	11	3	3	—		Jesus Loves
2025	"If God Lives Here"	—	—	—	—	—	—		Non-album single
2026	"Wait For Me" (with Ben Fuller)	—	—	10	1	2	—		Non-album single

==== As featured artist ====
Year	Title	Peak chart positions		Certifications	Album
Year	Title	US Christ	US Christ Airplay	Certifications	Album
2017	"The First Christmas" (Tenth Avenue North featuring Zach Williams)	35	20		Decade the Halls, Vol. 1
2020	"Rattle!" (Essential Worship featuring Zach Williams and Steven Furtick)	46	—		Non-album singles
2021	"Rise Up (Lazarus)" (Cain featuring Zach Williams)	—	—		Non-album singles
2023	"Cornerstone" (TobyMac featuring Zach Williams)	2	1	RIAA: Gold	Life After Death
2025	"Get Behind Me" (with Emerson Day)	—	—		Non-album single
2025	"Stranger No More" (with Big Daddy Weave)	—	—		Let It Begin

==== Promotional singles ====
Year	Title	Peak chart positions	Album
Year	Title	US Christ	Album
2019	"Walk with You"	35	Rescue Story

=== Other charted songs ===
List of charting songs, with selected chart positions
Title	Year	Peak chart positions			Album
Title	Year	US Christ	US Christ Airplay	US Christ AC	Album
"The Call of Christmas"	2017	49	31	6	WOW Christmas

== Awards and nominations ==
=== American Music Awards ===
Year	Nominee / work	Award	Result
2018	Zach Williams	Favorite Artist – Contemporary Inspirational	Nominated
2021	Zach Williams	Favorite Artist – Contemporary Inspirational	Nominated

=== Billboard Music Awards ===
Year	Nominee / work	Award	Result
2018	Zach Williams	Top Christian Artist	Nominated
2018	"Old Church Choir"	Top Christian Song	Nominated
2019	Zach Williams	Top Christian Artist	Nominated
2021	Zach Williams	Top Christian Artist	Nominated
2021	Rescue Story	Top Christian Album	Nominated
2021	"There Was Jesus" (with Dolly Parton)	Top Christian Song	Nominated

=== Grammy Awards ===
Year	Nominee/work	Award	Result
2017	"Chain Breaker"	Best Contemporary Christian Music Performance/Song	Nominated
2018	Chain Breaker	Best Contemporary Christian Music Album	Won
2019	Survivor: Live From Harding Prison	Best Contemporary Christian Music Album	Nominated
2020	"Rescue Story"	Best Contemporary Christian Music Performance/Song	Nominated
2021	"There Was Jesus" (featuring Dolly Parton)	Best Contemporary Christian Music Performance/Song	Won

=== GMA Dove Awards ===
Year	Nominee / work	Award	Result
2017	Zach Williams	New Artist of the Year	Won
2017	Zach Williams	Contemporary Christian Artist of the Year	Nominated
2017	"Chain Breaker"	Song of the Year	Nominated
2017	"Chain Breaker"	Pop/Contemporary Recorded Song of the Year	Won*
2017	Chain Breaker	Pop/Contemporary Album of the Year	Nominated
2019	Zach Williams	Contemporary Christian Artist of the Year	Nominated
2019	Survivor: Live From Harding Prison	Long Form Video of the Year	Nominated
2020	"Rescue Story"	Song of the Year	Nominated
2020	Zach Williams	Contemporary Christian Artist of the Year	Nominated
2020	Zach Williams	Artist of the Year	Nominated
2020	Rescue Story	Pop/Contemporary Album of the Year	Nominated
2020	Rescue Story	Recorded Music Packaging of the Year	Won
2021	"There Was Jesus"	Song of the Year	Nominated
2021	Zach Williams	Contemporary Christian Artist of the Year	Nominated
2021	Zach Williams	Artist of the Year	Nominated
2021	"Stand My Ground"	Rock/Contemporary Recorded Song of the Year	Nominated
2021	"There Was Jesus" (featuring Dolly Parton)	Pop/Contemporary Recorded Song of the Year	Nominated
2022	Zach Williams	Artist of the Year	Nominated

=== We Love Awards ===
Year	Nominee / work	Category	Result	Ref.
2025	"Jesus Loves"	Song of the Year	Won	
2025	"Jesus Loves"	Contemporary Song of the Year	Nominated	
2025	"Still" (with Crowder)	Collaboration of the Year	Nominated	

- * Was a joint win alongside Ryan Stevenson's "Eye of the Storm".
