= No Longer Slaves =

Single by Bethel Music featuring Jonathan David & Melissa Helser

from the album We Will Not Be Shaken
- Released: August 21, 2015
- Recorded: 2015
- Genre: Worship; CCM
- Length: 4:07
- Label: Bethel Music
- Songwriters: Jonathan Helser; Joel Case; Brian Johnson
- Producer: Ed Cash

Bethel Music singles chronology
"It Is Well" (2015)	"No Longer Slaves" (2015)	"Have It All" (2016)

Music video
- "No Longer Slaves (Live)" on YouTube

"No Longer Slaves" is a song by Bethel Music featuring Jonathan David & Melissa Helser and it was released on August 21, 2015, as Bethel Music's lead single from their seventh live album, We Will Not Be Shaken (2015). The song also appeared on the album Bethel Music en Español (2019). The song won the "Worship Song of the Year" award at the 47th Annual GMA Dove Awards in 2016, with Jonathan David & Melissa Helser performing it at the ceremony.

== Background ==
Composed by Jonathan Helser, Joel Case and Brian Johnson, a live version of the song was released as part of the Bethel Music compilation, We Will Not Be Shaken, on January 26, 2015. The live version was recorded on a mountaintop overlooking Shasta Lake in northern California, with Jonathan David & Melissa Helser leading the song.

The studio version of the song impacted Christian radio on August 21, 2015, as well as being distributed as a digital download, and was produced by award-winning producer Ed Cash.

== Music videos ==
The live music video of the song was released by the Bethel Music on January 26, 2015, having been recorded at Shasta Lake and is part of the concert film We Will Not Be Shaken directed by Nathan Grubbs and Luke Manwaring. The live video was later released on February 17, 2015, on Bethel Music's YouTube channel, with over 7 million views as of May 2017.

The official lyric video of the song was released on January 26, 2015, also on Bethel Music's YouTube channel and has been viewed over 180 million times as October 2025.

== Accolades ==
In August 2016, the Gospel Music Association announced the nominees of the 47th Annual GMA Dove Awards with "No Longer Slaves" being nominated for a Dove Award in the "Worship Song of the Year" category. On October 11, 2016, the song won the GMA Dove Award at a ceremony held at the Allen Arena on the campus of Lipscomb University in Nashville, Tennessee, with Jonathan David & Melissa Helser performing the song that night.

== Charts ==
Chart performance for "No Longer Slaves"
Chart (2015)	Peak position
US Hot Christian Songs (Billboard)	19
US Christian Airplay (Billboard)	20
US Christian AC (Billboard)	15

== Certifications ==
Region	Certification	Certified units/sales
United States (RIAA)	Platinum	1,000,000^{‡}
^{‡} Sales+streaming figures based on certification alone.

== Release history ==
Region	Date	Version	Format	Label	Ref.
Worldwide	August 21, 2015	Standard	Digital download	Bethel Music	
