= Whom Shall I Fear (God of Angel Armies) =

Single by Chris Tomlin

from the album Burning Lights
- Released: November 9, 2012
- Genre: CCM; worship
- Length: 4:27 (album version); 4:00 (radio edit)
- Label: sixsteps, Sparrow
- Songwriters: Ed Cash, Scott Cash, Chris Tomlin
- Producer: Ed Cash

Chris Tomlin singles chronology
"White Flag" (2012)	"Whom Shall I Fear (God of Angel Armies)" (2012)	"God's Great Dance Floor" (2013)

"Whom Shall I Fear (God of Angel Armies)" is a song by Christian contemporary Christian-modern worship musician Chris Tomlin from his seventh studio album, Burning Lights. It was released in the United States on November 9, 2012, as the first single from the album.

== Composition ==
"Whom Shall I Fear (God of Angel Armies)" was written by Ed Cash, Scott McTyeire Cash and Chris Tomlin. The song is composed in the key of C with a tempo of 74 beats per minute, and a musical time signature of 4/4.

== Release ==
The song "Whom Shall I Fear (God of Angel Armies)" was digitally released as the lead single from Burning Lights on November 9, 2012.

== Personnel ==
- Chris Tomlin – lead vocals
- Ed Cash – keyboards, programming, acoustic guitars, mandolin, bass, backing vocals
- Daniel Carson – electric guitars
- Paul Mabury – drums

== Charts ==
=== Weekly charts ===
Chart (2013)	Peak position
US Bubbling Under Hot 100 (Billboard)	11
US Christian AC (Billboard)	1
US Christian Airplay (Billboard)	1
US Hot Christian Songs (Billboard)	1
US Christian AC Indicator (Billboard)	1
US Christian Soft AC (Billboard)	1
US Heatseekers Songs (Billboard)	15

=== Year-end charts ===
Chart (2013)	Peak position
US Christian Songs (Billboard)	1
US Christian AC (Billboard)	1

=== Decade-end charts ===
Chart (2010s)	Position
US Christian Songs (Billboard)	10

== Certifications ==
Region	Certification	Certified units/sales
United States (RIAA)	Platinum	1,000,000^{‡}
^{‡} Sales+streaming figures based on certification alone.
