= Chain Breaker =

Single by Zach Willams

from the album Chain Breaker
- Released: May 24, 2016
- Genre: Christian country music
- Length: 3:16
- Label: Essential
- Songwriters: Zach Williams; Jonathan Smith; Mia Fieldes
- Producer: Jonathan Smith

Zach Willams singles chronology
"Chain Breaker" (2016)	"Old Church Choir" (2016)

Music video
- "Chain Breaker" on YouTube

"Chain Breaker" is the debut single from Christian rock artist Zach Williams from his debut studio album Chain Breaker. The song peaked at No.1 on the Hot Christian Songs for nine weeks. It has also been recorded by Southern Gospel Artists, Triumphant Quartet on their Thankful album and by The Gaither Vocal Band on their, We Have This Moment album.

== Background ==
"Chain Breaker" was written by Williams together with Jonathan Smith and Mia Fieldes. It was one of the first songs he and Jonathan Smith wrote together. When Smith played it for the staff at Provident, they wanted to sign him right away.

== Music video ==
The official music video was released on October 24, 2016 on Zach Williams' Vevo channel. It shows a middle-aged woman looking through a keepsake box with drawings made by a younger girl, with flashback scenes to when the woman was a drug and alcohol addict and the girl was trying to show her mother that Jesus loved her (at one point physically keeping her mother away from the pills). At the end, the mother (now clean and sober) greets her now grown daughter at the door to her home, holding one of the drawings.

== Track listing ==
No.	Title	Writer(s)	Producer(s)	Length
1.	"Chain Breaker"	Zachary Stephen Williams, Jonathan Smith, & Mia Fieldes	Jonathan Smith	3:16

== Charts ==
=== Weekly charts ===
Chart (2016–2017)	Peak position
US Christian Songs (Billboard)	1
US Christian Airplay (Billboard)	1
US Christian AC (Billboard)	1
US Hot Rock Songs (Billboard)	9

=== Year-end charts ===
Chart (2016)	Peak position
US Christian Songs (Billboard)	17
US Christian Airplay (Billboard)	23
US Christian AC (Billboard)	28
US Rock Songs (Billboard)	72

Chart (2017)	Peak position
US Christian Songs (Billboard)	4
US Christian Airplay (Billboard)	14
US Christian AC (Billboard)	6
US Rock Songs (Billboard)	25

=== Decade-end charts ===
Chart (2010s)	Position
US Christian Songs (Billboard)	19

== Certifications ==
Region	Certification	Certified units/sales
United States (RIAA)	2× Platinum	2,000,000^{‡}
^{‡} Sales+streaming figures based on certification alone.
