= Old Church Choir =

Single by Zach Williams

from the album Chain Breaker
- Released: September 23, 2016
- Genre: Christian rock, Southern rock, Southern gospel
- Length: 2:56
- Label: Essential
- Songwriters: Zach Williams; Ethan Hulse; Colby Wedgeworth
- Producer: Jonathan Smith

Zach Williams singles chronology
"Chain Breaker" (2016)	"Old Church Choir" (2016)	"Fear Is a Liar" (2018)

Music video
- "Chain Breaker" on YouTube

"Old Church Choir" is the second single from Christian rock artist Zach Williams from his debut studio album Chain Breaker. The song peaked at No. 1 on the Hot Christian Songs for one week. The song is his second Christian Airplay No. 1. The song clocked its nineteenth week on the Christian Airplay chart, tying Brandon Heath's "Give Me Your Eyes" from 2008. The song failed to break the record, being dethroned the following week by Tenth Avenue North's "Control (Somehow You Want Me)".

== Music video ==
The official music video was released on May 1, 2017 on Zach Williams' Vevo channel.

The video for “Old Church Choir” was filmed just outside of Nashville and was filled with extras who came from all across the country to be part of it.

== Track listing ==
No.	Title	Writer(s)	Producer(s)	Length
1.	"Old Church Choir"	Zachary Stephen Williams, Ethan Hulse, Colby Wedgeworth	Jonathan Smith	2:56

== Charts ==
=== Weekly charts ===
Chart (2016–2017)	Peak position
US Christian Airplay (Billboard)	1
US Christian Digital Songs (Billboard)	1
US Christian Songs (Billboard)	1
US Hot Rock Songs (Billboard)	7

=== Year-end charts ===
Chart (2017)	Peak position
US Christian Airplay (Billboard)	5
US Christian AC (Billboard)	10
US Christian CHR (Billboard)	13
US Christian Songs (Billboard)	8
US Rock Songs (Billboard)	19

Chart (2018)	Peak position
US Christian Airplay (Billboard)	29
US Christian AC (Billboard)	30
US Christian Songs (Billboard)	25

=== Decade-end charts ===
Chart (2010s)	Position
US Christian Songs (Billboard)	35

== Certifications ==
Region	Certification	Certified units/sales
United States (RIAA)	Platinum	1,000,000^{‡}
^{‡} Sales+streaming figures based on certification alone.
