= Christian Airplay =

Chart published weekly by Billboard magazine

Christian Airplay is a chart published weekly by Billboard magazine in the United States since June 21, 2003.

This chart lists the 50 most-listened-to records played on multiple Christian radio stations across the country as monitored by Nielsen BDS, weighted to each station's Nielsen ratings.

== History ==
The chart was originally titled "Hot Christian Songs". The chart included the songs with the most airplay on monitored Christian radio stations in the United States. Beginning with the chart dated December 7, 2013, Billboard changed the methodology of the Hot Christian Songs chart to factor in digital sales, streaming, and airplay of Christian songs over all radio formats. Christian Airplay was created to continue the tracking of airplay on Christian radio stations.

== Chart policies ==
As with most other Billboard charts, the Christian Airplay chart features a rule for when a song enters a recurrent rotation. Starting with the chart week of December 2, 2006, a song is declared recurrent on the country charts if it has been on the charts longer than 20 weeks; is not gaining in spins or audience impressions; and is lower than 10 in rank for either audience impressions or spins. If a song has been on the charts for over 52 weeks, it will be declared recurrent if it is below 5 in rank.

== Chart achievements ==
=== Most number-ones ===
Total	Artist	Source
19	MercyMe	
15	tobyMac	
14	For King & Country	
14	Matthew West	
12	Jeremy Camp	
11	Casting Crowns	
11	Chris Tomlin	
8	Phil Wickham	
7	Big Daddy Weave	
7	Crowder	

=== Most weeks at number one ===
Number of weeks	Artist(s)	Song	Year(s)	ref
23	MercyMe	"Word of God Speak"	2003	
20	Zach Williams	"Old Church Choir"	2017–18	
19	Casting Crowns	"East to West"	2007	
19	Brandon Heath	"Give Me Your Eyes"	2008	
18	Chris Tomlin	"Made to Worship"	2006	
17	Matthew West	"Hello, My Name Is"	2013	
16	MercyMe	"Greater"	2014–15	
16	Lauren Daigle	"You Say"	2018–19	
15	Jeremy Camp	"Take You Back"	2005	
15	Building 429	"Where I Belong"	2012	
15	Chris Tomlin	"Whom Shall I Fear (God of Angel Armies)"	2013	
15	Zach Williams	"Chain Breaker"	2016–17	
15	Casting Crowns featuring Matthew West	"Nobody"	2019–20	

=== Number one debuts ===
Artist(s)	Song	Year(s)	ref
We Are Messengers	"We Three Kings"	2025	

=== Most top-10s ===
Total	Artist	Source
33	MercyMe	
33	Chris Tomlin	
32	Tobymac	
30	Casting Crowns	
30	Jeremy Camp	
29	Matthew West	
22	Big Daddy Weave	
18	For King & Country	
17	Phil Wickham	
15	Lauren Daigle	
15	Crowder	

=== Most Entries ===
Total	Artist	Source
56	Tobymac	
53	Chris Tomlin	
49	MercyMe	
47	Matthew West	
42	Jeremy Camp	
40	Casting Crowns	
36	Phil Wickham	
34	Big Daddy Weave	
29	For King & Country	
27	Tenth Avenue North	
