= List of awards and nominations received by Ariana Grande =

Ariana Grande awards and nominations
- Grande in 2026
Awards and nominations
Award	Wins	Nominations
Academy Awards	0	1
Actor Awards	0	4
American Music Awards	3	21
Billboard Music Awards	2	42
Brit Awards	1	5
BAFTA Awards	0	2
Critics' Choice Awards	0	7
Emmy Awards	0	1
Golden Globe Awards	0	2
Grammy Awards	3	24
MTV Video Music Awards	15	65

Totals (Note: Certain award groups do not simply award one winner. They acknowledge several different recipients, have runners-up, and have third place. Since this is a specific recognition and is different from losing an award, runner-up mentions are considered wins in this award tally. For simplification and to avoid errors, each award in this list has been presumed to have had a prior nomination.)
- Wins: 458
- Nominations: 1000

American singer, songwriter, and actress Ariana Grande has won many accolades and awards throughout her career. Her debut album Yours Truly was released in 2013, which debuted at No. 1 on the US Billboard 200 chart. The album spawned three singles "The Way", "Baby I" and "Right There", all which entered the Hot 100. That same year, she won New Artist of the Year at the American Music Awards. She played the titular role of Cat in the teen sitcom Sam & Cat (2013–14), for which she won a Favorite TV Actress award at the Nickelodeon Kids' Choice Awards.

In 2014, Grande released her second studio album, My Everything, preceded by its lead single "Problem". At the 2014 MTV Video Music Awards, "Problem" won the Best Pop Video award, and garnered three nominations, including Best Female Video. The single also won Best Song at the 2014 MTV Europe Music Awards. She won the Favorite Breakout Artist award at the 40th ceremony of the People's Choice Awards. At the 2014 Young Hollywood Awards, Grande earned four nominations, including Hottest Music Artist. At the 57th Annual Grammy Awards, Grande was nominated for two awards. In 2015, she won another American Music Award for Favorite Pop/Rock Female Artist and an iHeartRadio Music Award for Best Collaboration for "Bang Bang". She has won a total of ten Teen Choice Awards and six Radio Disney Music Awards.

In 2016, Grande released her third studio album, Dangerous Woman. She was nominated for five awards at the 2016 MTV Video Music Awards, which included Best Pop Video and Best Female Video for her second single "Into You". She won the American Music Award for Artist of the Year. At the 59th Annual Grammy Awards, Grande was nominated for two more awards, for Best Pop Solo Performance for her single "Dangerous Woman" as well as Best Pop Vocal Album, her second nomination in that category. In 2017, she was nominated for Artist of the Year at the 2017 MTV Video Music Awards.

In 2018, Grande released her fourth studio album, Sweetener, releasing lead single "No Tears Left to Cry". Grande was nominated for five awards at the 2018 MTV Video Music Awards, including Artist of the Year and Video of the Year for "No Tears Left to Cry", but ultimately won Best Pop Video for the latter song. In December 2018, Grande was named Billboard's Woman of the Year. In 2019, Grande released her fifth studio album, Thank U, Next, which includes the lead single "Thank U, Next". Grande was nominated for two awards at the 61st Annual Grammy Awards, winning her first award for Best Pop Vocal Album for Sweetener. She was also nominated for Best Pop Solo Performance for Sweetener's second single, "God is a Woman". Grande also won the award for International Female Solo Artist at the 2019 Brit Awards. Grande was nominated for nine awards at the 2019 Billboard Music Awards, including Top Artist; she won two awards, for Billboard Chart Achievement and Top Female Artist. Grande was also nominated for 12 awards at the 2019 MTV Video Music Awards, including Video of the Year for "Thank U, Next". She won three awards, including Artist of the Year. Grande was also nominated for five Grammy awards at the 62nd Annual Grammy Awards, including Album of the Year and Best Pop Vocal Album for Thank U, Next and Record of the Year for "7 Rings".

Grande was nominated for nine VMAs at the 2020 MTV Video Music Awards, including Video of the Year for "Rain on Me" with Lady Gaga. Grande would go on to win a Grammy Award at the 63rd Annual Grammy Awards for Best Pop Duo/Group Performance for "Rain on Me" with Lady Gaga, making it the first female-collaboration to win the award. As of 2026, Grande has broken a total of 41 Guinness World Records. At the 64th Annual Grammy Awards, Grande was nominated for three awards, for Best Pop Vocal Album for her sixth studio album, Positions, which became her fifth consecutive nomination in this category, tied for the most by any artist, and Best Pop Solo Performance for the single, "Positions", where she also tied for the most nominations in this category with four total. Furthermore, for her work on Doja Cat's third studio album, Planet Her, as a collaborator and songwriter on the track, "I Don't Do Drugs", she was nominated for Album of the Year for the second time. In 2021, Grande starred in the film Don't Look Up, directed and written by Adam McKay, playing the character Riley Bina. For her role in the film - as well as for her contributions to the film's song, "Just Look Up", written and performed by Grande, she has received numerous nominations, including a Critics Choice Award and a Screen Actors Guild Award.

In 2024, Grande released her seventh album, Eternal Sunshine. She was nominated for seven awards at the 2024 MTV Video Music Awards, including Video of the Year for the album's single "We Can't Be Friends (Wait for Your Love)". She also received five nominations at the 2024 MTV Europe Music Awards and won Best Pop. At the 67th Annual Grammy Awards, she earned three nominations, including Best Pop/Duo Group Performance, Best Dance Pop Recording and her sixth nomination for Best Pop Vocal Album, tying with Kelly Clarkson and Taylor Swift for the most nominations in the category.

Grande starred as Galinda Upland in Wicked (2024) and Wicked: For Good (2025), a two part film adaptation of the stage musical. Her performance drew widespread acclaim and earned her nominations for two Golden Globe Awards, two Critics' Choice Awards, two Screen Actors Guild Awards, one BAFTA Award, and one Academy Award for Best Supporting Actress as well as her second Grammy award in the Best Pop Duo/Group Performance category for "Defying Gravity" from the film's soundtrack. In 2026, Grande released her eighth studio album, Petal, and its lead single, "Hate That I Made You Love Me". At the 69th Annual Grammy Awards, the album and the single earned nominations for Best Pop Vocal Album (setting a new record for most Best Pop Vocal Album nominations with seven), Best Music Video, and her first ever nomination for Song of the Year. She also received a nomination for Best Traditional Pop Vocal Performance for her and Cynthia Erivo's rendition of "For Good" from the Wicked: For Good soundtrack.

== Major associations ==
=== Academy Awards ===
Year	Category	Nominated work	Result	Ref.
2025	Best Supporting Actress	Wicked	Nominated	

=== Actor Awards ===
Year	Category	Nominated work	Result	Ref.
2022	Outstanding Performance by a Cast in a Motion Picture	Don't Look Up	Nominated	
2025	Outstanding Performance by a Cast in a Motion Picture	Wicked	Nominated	
2025	Outstanding Performance by a Female Actor in a Supporting Role	Wicked	Nominated	
2026	Outstanding Performance by a Female Actor in a Supporting Role	Wicked: For Good	Nominated	

=== BAFTA Awards ===
Year	Category	Nominated work	Result	Ref.
British Academy Film Awards
2025	Best Actress in a Supporting Role	Wicked	Nominated	
British Academy Television Awards
2018	Virgin TV's Must-See Moment	One Love Manchester – Ariana Grande sings "One Last Time"	Nominated	

=== Emmy Awards ===
Year	Category	Nominated work	Result	Ref.
Primetime Emmy Awards
2026	Outstanding Variety Special (Pre-Recorded)	Wicked: One Wonderful Night	Nominated	

=== Golden Globe Awards ===
Year	Category	Nominated work	Result	Ref.
2025	Best Supporting Actress – Motion Picture	Wicked	Nominated	
2026	Best Supporting Actress – Motion Picture	Wicked: For Good	Nominated	

=== Grammy Awards ===
Year	Category	Nominated work	Result	Ref.
2015	Best Pop Duo/Group Performance	"Bang Bang" (with Jessie J and Nicki Minaj)	Nominated	
2015	Best Pop Vocal Album	My Everything	Nominated	
2017	Best Pop Solo Performance	"Dangerous Woman"	Nominated	
2017	Best Pop Vocal Album	Dangerous Woman	Nominated	
2019	Best Pop Solo Performance	"God Is a Woman"	Nominated	
2019	Best Pop Vocal Album	Sweetener	Won	
2020	Record of the Year	"7 Rings"	Nominated	
2020	Best Pop Solo Performance	"7 Rings"	Nominated	
2020	Album of the Year	Thank U, Next	Nominated	
2020	Best Pop Vocal Album	Thank U, Next	Nominated	
2020	Best Pop Duo/Group Performance	"Boyfriend" (with Social House)	Nominated	
2021	Best Pop Duo/Group Performance	"Rain on Me" (with Lady Gaga)	Won	
2022	Album of the Year	Planet Her (as songwriter and featured artist)	Nominated	
2022	Best Pop Solo Performance	"Positions"	Nominated	
2022	Best Pop Vocal Album	Positions	Nominated	
2025	Best Pop Duo/Group Performance	"The Boy Is Mine" (with Brandy and Monica)	Nominated	
2025	Best Pop Vocal Album	Eternal Sunshine	Nominated	
2025	Best Dance Pop Recording	"Yes, And?"	Nominated	
2026	Best Pop Duo/Group Performance	"Defying Gravity" (with Cynthia Erivo)	Won	
2026	Best Compilation Soundtrack for Visual Media	Wicked: The Soundtrack (with Cynthia Erivo)	Nominated	
2027	Song of the Year	"Hate That I Made You Love Me"	Pending	
2027	Best Music Video	"Hate That I Made You Love Me"	Pending	
2027	Best Pop Vocal Album	Petal	Pending	
2027	Best Traditional Pop Vocal Performance	"For Good" (with Cynthia Erivo)	Pending	

== Miscellaneous awards ==
List of awards and nominations, showing ceremony, year, category, recipient and result
Award	Year (Note: Indicates the year of ceremony. Each year is linked to the article about the awards held that year, wherever possible.)	Category	Recipient	Result	Ref.
AACTA International Awards	2025	Best International Supporting Actress	Wicked	Nominated	
AARP Movies for Grownups Awards	2022	Best Ensemble	Don't Look Up	Nominated	
Alliance of Women Film Journalists	2024	Best Ensemble Cast and Casting Director	Wicked	Nominated	
Allure Best of Beauty Awards	2022	Best Mascara (Length)	r.e.m. beauty by Ariana Grande	Won	
Allure Readers' Choice Awards	2022	Best New Brand	r.e.m. beauty by Ariana Grande	Won	
Allure Readers' Choice Awards	2023	Best Fragrance	Ariana Grande Cloud	Won	
Allure Readers' Choice Awards	2024	Best Fragrance	Ariana Grande Cloud	Nominated	
Allure Readers' Choice Awards	2025	Best Fragrance	Ariana Grande Cloud	Nominated	
American Music Awards	2013	New Artist of the Year	Herself	Won	
American Music Awards	2015	Favorite Pop/Rock Female Artist	Herself	Won	
American Music Awards	2015	Artist of the Year	Herself	Nominated	
American Music Awards	2016	Artist of the Year	Herself	Won	
American Music Awards	2018	Favorite Social Artist	Herself	Nominated	
American Music Awards	2019	Favorite Social Artist	Herself	Nominated	
American Music Awards	2019	Artist of the Year	Herself	Nominated	
American Music Awards	2019	Favorite Pop/Rock Female Artist	Herself	Nominated	
American Music Awards	2019	Tour of the Year	Sweetener World Tour	Nominated	
American Music Awards	2019	Favorite Pop/Rock Album	Thank U, Next	Nominated	
American Music Awards	2019	Favorite Music Video	"7 Rings"	Nominated	
American Music Awards	2020	Favorite Music Video	"Rain on Me" (with Lady Gaga)	Nominated	
American Music Awards	2020	Collaboration of the Year	"Rain on Me" (with Lady Gaga)	Nominated	
American Music Awards	2020	Favorite Social Artist	Herself	Nominated	
American Music Awards	2021	Artist of the Year	Herself	Nominated	
American Music Awards	2021	Favorite Pop/Rock Female Artist	Herself	Nominated	
American Music Awards	2021	Favorite Pop Song	"Save Your Tears (Remix)" (with The Weeknd)	Nominated	
American Music Awards	2021	Favorite Pop/Rock Album	Positions	Nominated	
American Music Awards	2025	Artist of the Year	Herself	Nominated	
American Music Awards	2025	Favorite Soundtrack	Wicked: The Soundtrack	Nominated	
American Music Awards	2026	Favorite Soundtrack	Wicked: For Good - The Soundtrack	Nominated	
Artist & Manager Awards	2017	Industry Champion	One Love Manchester	Won	
ASCAP Pop Music Awards	2015	Most Performed Songs	"Problem" (featuring Iggy Azalea)	Won	
ASCAP Pop Music Awards	2018	Winning Songs	"Side to Side" (featuring Nicki Minaj)	Won	
ASCAP Pop Music Awards	2019	Winning Songs	"God Is a Woman"	Won	
ASCAP Pop Music Awards	2019	Winning Songs	"No Tears Left to Cry"	Won	
ASCAP Pop Music Awards	2020	Winning Songs	"7 Rings"	Won	
ASCAP Pop Music Awards	2020	Winning Songs	"Break Up with Your Girlfriend, I'm Bored"	Won	
ASCAP Pop Music Awards	2020	Winning Songs	"Breathin"	Won	
ASCAP Pop Music Awards	2020	Winning Songs	"Thank U, Next"	Won	
ASCAP Pop Music Awards	2022	Winning Songs	"Positions"	Won	
ASCAP Pop Music Awards	2022	Winning Songs	"34+35"	Won	
ASCAP Pop Music Awards	2022	Winning Songs	"POV"	Won	
ARIA Music Awards	2019	Best International Artist	Thank U, Next	Nominated	
ARIA Music Awards	2021	Best International Artist	Positions	Nominated	
ARIA Music Awards	2024	Best International Artist	Eternal Sunshine	Nominated	
ARIA Number One Chart Awards
ARIA Number One Chart Awards	2014	Number One Album	My Everything	Won	
ARIA Number One Chart Awards	2016	Number One Album	Dangerous Woman	Won	
ARIA Number One Chart Awards	2018	Number One Album	Sweetener	Won	
ARIA Number One Chart Awards	2019	Number One Album	Thank U, Next	Won	
ARIA Number One Chart Awards	2024	Number One Album	Eternal Sunshine	Won	
ARIA Number One Chart Awards	2025	Number One Album	Wicked: For Good - The Soundtrack	Won	
ARIA Number One Chart Awards	2026	Number One Album	Petal	Won	
ARIA Number One Chart Awards	2018	Number One Single	"No Tears Left to Cry"	Won	
ARIA Number One Chart Awards	2018	Number One Single	"Thank U, Next"	Won	
ARIA Number One Chart Awards	2019	Number One Single	"7 Rings"	Won	
ARIA Number One Chart Awards	2020	Number One Single	"Positions"	Won	
Astra Film Awards	2022	Best Cast Ensemble	Don't Look Up	Nominated	
Astra Film Awards	2024	Best Supporting Actress	Wicked	Won (Note: Tied with Zoe Saldaña for Emilia Pérez.)	
Astra Film Awards	2024	Best Cast Ensemble	Wicked	Nominated	
Astra Film Awards	2026	Best Supporting Actress – Comedy or Musical	Wicked: For Good	Won	
Astra Film Awards	2026	Best Cast Ensemble	Wicked: For Good	Nominated	
Astra TV Awards	2025	Best Guest Actress in a Comedy Series	Saturday Night Live	Nominated	
Austin Film Critics Association	2024	Best Supporting Actress	Wicked	Nominated	
Bambi Awards	2014	Best Newcomer	Herself	Won	
BBC Radio 1's Teen Awards	2016	Best International Solo Artist	Herself	Nominated	
BBC Radio 1's Teen Awards	2017	Best International Solo Artist	Herself	Won	
BBC Radio 1's Teen Awards	2019	Best International Solo Artist	Herself	Won	
Berlin Commercial Awards	2025	Color Grading	Brighter Days Ahead	Shortlisted	
BET Awards	2014	Best New Artist	Herself	Nominated	
BET Awards	2025	BET Her Award	"Defying Gravity" (with Cynthia Erivo)	Nominated	
Billboard.com Mid-Year Music Awards	2013	Best Newcomer	Herself	Won	
Billboard.com Mid-Year Music Awards	2014	First-Half MVP	Herself	Nominated	
Billboard.com Mid-Year Music Awards	2014	Best Music Video	"Problem" (featuring Iggy Azalea)	Nominated	
Billboard.com Mid-Year Music Awards	2014	Best Televised Performance	Herself, Iggy Azalea and Charli XCX	Won	
Billboard.com Mid-Year Music Awards	2014	Most Anticipated Music Event of 2014's Second Half	Grande's second album	Nominated	
Billboard Music Awards	2014	Top New Artist	Herself	Nominated	
Billboard Music Awards	2015	Top Artist	Herself	Nominated	
Billboard Music Awards	2015	Top Female Artist	Herself	Nominated	
Billboard Music Awards	2015	Top Hot 100 Artist	Herself	Nominated	
Billboard Music Awards	2015	Top Social Artist	Herself	Nominated	
Billboard Music Awards	2015	Top Streaming Artist	Herself	Nominated	
Billboard Music Awards	2015	Top Dance/Electronic Song	"Break Free" (featuring Zedd)	Nominated	
Billboard Music Awards	2016	Top Social Artist	Herself	Nominated	
Billboard Music Awards	2016	Top Female Artist	Herself	Nominated	
Billboard Music Awards	2017	Top Female Artist	Herself	Nominated	
Billboard Music Awards	2017	Top Artist	Herself	Nominated	
Billboard Music Awards	2017	Top Social Artist	Herself	Nominated	
Billboard Music Awards	2018	Top Social Artist	Herself	Nominated	
Billboard Music Awards	2019	Top Artist	Herself	Nominated	
Billboard Music Awards	2019	Top Female Artist	Herself	Won	
Billboard Music Awards	2019	Billboard Chart Achievement Award	Herself	Won	
Billboard Music Awards	2019	Top Hot 100 Artist	Herself	Nominated	
Billboard Music Awards	2019	Top Billboard 200 Artist	Herself	Nominated	
Billboard Music Awards	2019	Top Streaming Artist	Herself	Nominated	
Billboard Music Awards	2019	Top Song Sales Artist	Herself	Nominated	
Billboard Music Awards	2019	Top Radio Songs Artist	Herself	Nominated	
Billboard Music Awards	2019	Top Social Artist	Herself	Nominated	
Billboard Music Awards	2020	Top Social Artist	Herself	Nominated	
Billboard Music Awards	2020	Top Female Artist	Herself	Nominated	
Billboard Music Awards	2020	Top Billboard 200 Album	Thank U, Next	Nominated	
Billboard Music Awards	2021	Top Female Artist	Herself	Nominated	
Billboard Music Awards	2021	Top Social Artist	Herself	Nominated	
Billboard Music Awards	2021	Top Dance/Electronic Song	"Rain on Me" (with Lady Gaga)	Nominated	
Billboard Music Awards	2022	Top Global 200 Song	"Save Your Tears (Remix)" (with The Weeknd)	Nominated	
Billboard Music Awards	2022	Top Global (Excl. US) Song	"Save Your Tears (Remix)" (with The Weeknd)	Nominated	
Billboard Music Awards	2022	Top Hot 100 Song	"Save Your Tears (Remix)" (with The Weeknd)	Nominated	
Billboard Music Awards	2022	Top Collaboration	"Save Your Tears (Remix)" (with The Weeknd)	Nominated	
Billboard Music Awards	2022	Top Streaming Song	"Save Your Tears (Remix)" (with The Weeknd)	Nominated	
Billboard Music Awards	2022	Top Radio Song	"Save Your Tears (Remix)" (with The Weeknd)	Nominated	
Billboard Music Awards	2023	Top Global 200 Song	"Die For You (Remix)" (with The Weeknd)	Nominated	
Billboard Music Awards	2023	Top Global (Excl. US) Song	"Die For You (Remix)" (with The Weeknd)	Nominated	
Billboard Music Awards	2023	Top Collaboration	"Die For You (Remix)" (with The Weeknd)	Nominated	
Billboard Music Awards	2023	Top Radio Song	"Die For You (Remix)" (with The Weeknd)	Nominated	
Billboard Music Awards	2023	Top R&B Song	"Die For You (Remix)" (with The Weeknd)	Nominated	
Billboard Music Awards	2024	Top Billboard Global 200 Artist	Herself	Nominated	
Billboard Music Awards	2024	Top Billboard Global (Excl. U.S.) Artist	Herself	Nominated	
Billboard Music Awards	2024	Top Dance/Electronic Song	"Yes, And?"	Nominated	
Billboard Women in Music	2014	Rising Star	Herself	Won	
Billboard Women in Music	2018	Woman of the Year	Herself	Won	
Bravo Otto	2013	Superstar	Herself	Nominated	
Bravo Otto	2013	Super-BFFs	Herself and Jennette McCurdy	Nominated	
Bravo Otto	2015	Super Female Singer	Herself	Bronze	
Bravo Otto	2021	Super International Singer	Herself	Gold	
Bravo Otto	2022	Super International Singer	Herself	Gold	
Bravo Otto	2025	Super International Singer	Herself	Nominated	
Break the Internet Awards	2018	Music Drop of the Year	Sweetener	Won	
Break the Internet Awards	2018	Celebrity Pet of the Year	Piggy Smallz	Won	
BreakTudo Awards	2018	Best International Female Artist	Herself	Nominated	
BreakTudo Awards	2019	Best International Female Artist	Herself	Nominated	
BreakTudo Awards	2019	Best International Fandom	Arianators	Nominated	
BreakTudo Awards	2019	Clip Boom of the Year	"Thank U, Next"	Nominated	
BreakTudo Awards	2019	Best International Hit	"Thank U, Next"	Nominated	
BreakTudo Awards	2019	Album of the Year	Thank U, Next	Nominated	
BreakTudo Awards	2020	Best International Music Video	"Rain On Me" (with Lady Gaga)	Nominated	
BreakTudo Awards	2020	Best International Fandom	Arianators	Nominated	
BreakTudo Awards	2020	Best International Female Artist	Herself	Nominated	
BreakTudo Awards	2021	Best International Female Artist	Herself	Won	
BreakTudo Awards	2021	Album of the Year	Positions	Won	
BreakTudo Awards	2021	Best International Hit	"Save Your Tears"	Nominated	
BreakTudo Awards	2021	Best International Music Video	"Positions"	Nominated	
BreakTudo Awards	2022	Best International Female Artist	Herself	Won	
BreakTudo Awards	2022	Best International Fandom	Arianators	Nominated	
BreakTudo Awards	2023	Best International Collaboration	"Die for You (Remix)" (with The Weeknd)	Won	
BreakTudo Awards	2024	Best International Fandom	Arianators	Nominated	
BreakTudo Awards	2024	Best International Music Video	"We Can't Be Friends (Wait for Your Love)"	Nominated	
BreakTudo Awards	2024	Best International Female Artist	Herself	Nominated	
BreakTudo Awards	2025	Best International Female Artist	Herself	Nominated	
Brit Awards	2016	International Female Solo Artist	Herself	Nominated	
Brit Awards	2019	International Female Solo Artist	Herself	Won	
Brit Awards	2020	International Female Solo Artist	Herself	Nominated	
Brit Awards	2021	International Female Solo Artist	Herself	Nominated	
Brit Awards	2026	Song of the Year	"Defying Gravity" (featuring Cynthia Erivo)	Nominated	
British LGBT Awards	2017	Celebrity Straight Allies	Herself	Nominated	
British LGBT Awards	2018	Celebrity Straight Allies	Herself	Nominated	
Buenos Aires Music Video Festival Awards	2021	Video of the Year	"34+35 (Remix)" (with Doja Cat and Megan Thee Stallion)	Nominated	
Camerimage International Film Festival	2025	Best Cinematography in a Music Video	"Supernatural"	Nominated	
Camerimage International Film Festival	2025	Best Music Video	"Supernatural"	Nominated	
Chicago Film Critics Association	2024	Best Supporting Actress	Wicked	Nominated	
Clio Awards	2019	Visual Effects	"No Tears Left to Cry"	Gold	
Clio Awards	2019	Music Videos	"No Tears Left to Cry"	Silver	
Clio Awards	2020	Music Marketing – Partnerships & Collaborations	"Ice Cream" (Blackpink with Selena Gomez) (Note: Ariana Grande is credited as a songwriter.)	Silver	
Clio Awards	2025	Album Launch/Artist Promotion Integrated Campaign	Ariana Grande's 7th Studio Album 'eternal sunshine'	Bronze	
Clio Awards	2026	Music Film & Video Craft - Cinematography	Brighter Days Ahead	Silver	
Clio Awards	2026	Music Film & Video - Five Minutes and Over	Brighter Days Ahead	Bronze	
Clio Awards	2026	Music Film & Video - Music Videos	Brighter Days Ahead	Bronze	
Clio Entertainment Awards	2025	Partnerships & Collaborations	WICKED Brand Partnerships (Note: r.e.m. beauty by Ariana Grande is credited as a brand partner.)	Grand Winner	
Clio Entertainment Awards	2025	Branded Entertainment & Content	WICKED Brand Partnerships	Gold	
Cosmopolitan Holy Grail Beauty Awards	2023	Best Liquid Eyeliner	r.e.m. beauty by Ariana Grande	Won	
Cosmopolitan Readers’ Choice Beauty Awards	2023	Best Celebrity Brand	r.e.m. beauty by Ariana Grande	Won	
Cosmopolitan Readers’ Choice Beauty Awards	2024	Best Celebrity Brand	r.e.m. beauty by Ariana Grande	Nominated	
Cosmopolitan Readers’ Choice Beauty Awards	2025	Best Celebrity Brand	r.e.m. beauty by Ariana Grande	Nominated	
Cosmopolitan Readers’ Choice Beauty Awards	2025	Best Highlighter	r.e.m. beauty by Ariana Grande	Won	
Cosmopolitan UK Beauty Awards	2022	Best Concealer (Note: Cosmopolitan Winter Beauty Award)	r.e.m. beauty by Ariana Grande	Won	
Critics' Choice Movie Awards	2022	Best Song	"Just Look Up" (With Kid Cudi)	Nominated	
Critics' Choice Movie Awards	2022	Best Acting Ensemble	Don't Look Up	Nominated	
Critics' Choice Movie Awards	2025	Best Supporting Actress	Wicked	Nominated	
Critics' Choice Movie Awards	2025	Best Acting Ensemble	Wicked	Nominated	
Critics' Choice Movie Awards	2026	Best Supporting Actress	Wicked: For Good	Nominated	
Critics' Choice Real TV Awards	2022	Best Ensemble Cast in an Unscripted Series	The Voice	Nominated	
The Cybersmile Foundation	2017	Cybersmiler of the Month Award	Herself	Won	
Dallas–Fort Worth Film Critics Association	2024	Best Supporting Actress	Wicked	3rd place	
Danish Music Awards	2019	Foreign Album of the Year	Thank U, Next	Nominated	
Danish Music Awards	2021	Foreign Album of the Year	Positions	Nominated	
Detroit Film Critics Society	2021	Best Ensemble	Don't Look Up	Nominated	
Digital Spy Reader Awards	2018	Best Singer	Herself	Won	
Digital Spy Reader Awards	2018	Best Song	"No Tears Left to Cry"	2nd place	
Digital Spy Reader Awards	2018	Best Fanbase	Arianators	3rd place	
Digital Spy Reader Awards	2024	Best Actor	Wicked	2nd place	
Digital Spy Reader Awards	2025	Best Actor	Wicked: For Good	2nd place	
Dorian Awards	2025	Supporting Film Performance of the Year	Wicked	Won	
Dorian Awards	2025	Best TV Musical Performance	Ariana Grande and Cynthia Erivo performing at the 97th Academy Awards	Won	
Dorian Awards	2026	Supporting Film Performance of the Year	Wicked: For Good	Nominated	
Douban Abilu Music Awards	2017	International Pop Album of the Year	Dangerous Woman	Won	
Ex. Awards	2022	Best Buzz Marketing/Influencer Program	r.e.m. beauty by Ariana Grande	Silver	
FiFi Awards (United States)	2016	Fragrance of the Year Women's Popular	Ariana Grande Ari	Nominated	
FiFi Awards (United States)	2017	Fragrance of the Year Women's Popular	Ariana Grande Sweet Like Candy	Won	
FiFi Awards (United States)	2019	Fragrance of the Year Women's Popular	Ariana Grande Cloud	Won	
FiFi Awards (United States)	2020	Fragrance of the Year – Popular	Ariana Grande thank u, next	Nominated	
FiFi Awards (United States)	2021	Fragrance of the Year – Popular	Ariana Grande R.E.M.	Won	
FiFi Awards (United States)	2022	Fragrance of the Year – Popular	Ariana Grande God is a woman	Nominated	
FiFi Awards (United States)	2023	Fragrance of the Year – Popular	Ariana Grande Mod Vanilla	Nominated	
FiFi Awards (United States)	2024	Fragrance of the Year - Popular	Ariana Grande Cloud Pink	Nominated	
FiFi Awards (United Kingdom)	2020	Best New Media Campaign	Ariana Grande thank u, next	Won	
FiFi Awards (United Kingdom)	2023	Design & Packaging	Ariana Grande Cloud 2.0 Intense	Nominated	
FiFi Awards (United Kingdom)	2024	People's Choice	Ariana Grande Cloud Pink	Nominated	
FiFi Awards (United Kingdom)	2024	People's Choice	Ariana Grande MOD Vanilla	Nominated	
FiFi Awards (Germany) (Note: Duftstars Awards are a German version of the FiFi Awards, both presented by The Fragrance Foundation)	2017	Public's Choice: Lifestyle Fragrance – Women	Ariana Grande Sweet Like Candy	Nominated	
FiFi Awards (Germany)	2018	Public's Choice: Lifestyle Fragrance – Women	Ariana Grande Moonlight	Nominated	
FiFi Awards (Germany)	2019	Consumer Choice, Women's Popular	Ariana Grande Cloud	Won	
FiFi Awards (Germany)	2019	Public's Choice: Lifestyle Fragrance – Women	Ariana Grande Cloud	Nominated	
FiFi Awards (Germany)	2020	Public's Choice: Lifestyle Fragrance – Women	Ariana Grande thank u, next	Nominated	
FiFi Awards (Germany)	2022	Public's Choice: Lifestyle Fragrance – Women	Ariana Grande God is a woman	Nominated	
Filipino Music Awards	2026	People's Choice Awards – International Artist	Herself	Pending	
GAFFA Awards (Denmark)	2019	International Solo Artist	Herself	Won	
GAFFA Awards (Denmark)	2019	International Song of the Year	"Thank U, Next"	Won	
GAFFA Awards (Denmark)	2019	International Album of the Year	Sweetener	Nominated	
GAFFA Awards (Denmark)	2020	International Solo Artist of the Year	Herself	Nominated	
GAFFA Awards (Denmark)	2021	International Solo Artist of the Year	Herself	Won	
GAFFA Awards (Denmark)	2021	International Album of the Year	Positions	Nominated	
GAFFA Awards (Norway)	2018	International Solo Artist	Herself	Won	
GAFFA Awards (Norway)	2018	International Song of the Year	"God Is a Woman"	Nominated	
GAFFA Awards (Sweden)	2019	International Solo Artist	Herself	Won	
GAFFA Awards (Sweden)	2019	International Album of the Year	Sweetener	Won	
GAFFA Awards (Sweden)	2019	International Song of the Year	"Thank U, Next"	Nominated	
GAFFA Awards (Sweden)	2021	International Song of the Year	"34+35"	Nominated	
GAFFA Awards (Sweden)	2021	International Solo Artist	Herself	Nominated	
Georgia Film Critics Association	2022	Best Original Song	"Just Look Up" (with Kid Cudi)	Nominated	
Georgia Film Critics Association	2025	Best Supporting Actress	Wicked	Runner-up	
Georgia Film Critics Association	2025	Best Ensemble	Wicked	Nominated	
Georgia Film Critics Association	2025	Best Supporting Actress	Wicked: For Good	Nominated	
Glamour Awards	2016	International Musician/Solo Artist	Herself	Nominated	
Glamour Awards	2017	International Music Act	Herself	Nominated	
Glamour Beauty Awards	2023	Best Face Mist (Note: Glamour Beauty & Wellness Awards)	r.e.m. beauty by Ariana Grande	Won	
Glamour Beauty Awards	2023	Best Eyeshadow	r.e.m. beauty by Ariana Grande	Won	
Glamour Beauty Awards	2024	Best Liquid Eyeliner	r.e.m. beauty by Ariana Grande	Won	
Global Awards	2018	Best Female	Herself	Nominated	
Global Awards	2019	Best Female	Herself	Nominated	
Global Awards	2019	Best Song	"No Tears Left to Cry"	Nominated	
Global Awards	2020	Best Female	Herself	Nominated	
Global Awards	2024	Best Fans	Herself	Nominated	
Golden Schmoes Awards	2025	Best Supporting Actress	Wicked	Runner-up	
Gracie Awards	2017	Ensemble Cast	Hairspray Live!	Won	
Guild of Music Supervisors Awards	2020	Song Written and/or Recorded for a Film	"Don't Call Me Angel" (with Miley Cyrus and Lana Del Rey)	Nominated	
Hit FM Music Awards (Note: The Hit FM Music Awards was established in 2008 to honor Western pop music in China.)	2015	Party Song of the Year	"Bang Bang" (with Jessie J and Nicki Minaj)	Won	
Hit FM Music Awards	2020	Female Artist of the Year	Herself	Nominated	
Hit FM Music Awards	2020	Top Ten Singles	"7 Rings"	Nominated	
Hit FM Music Awards	2021	Top Ten Singles	"Stuck with U" (with Justin Bieber)	Won	
Hit FM Music Awards	2021	Top Ten Singles	"Rain on Me" (with Lady Gaga)	Nominated	
Hit FM Music Awards	2021	Top Ten Singles	"Positions"	Nominated	
Hit FM Music Awards	2021	Top Ten Singles	"34+35"	Nominated	
Hit FM Music Awards	2021	Collaboration of the Year	"Rain on Me" (with Lady Gaga)	Nominated	
Hit FM Music Awards	2021	Collaboration of the Year	"Stuck with U" (with Justin Bieber)	Nominated	
Hit FM Music Awards	2021	Female Artist of the Year	Herself	Nominated	
Hit FM Music Awards	2022	Collaboration of the Year	"Save Your Tears (Remix)" (with The Weeknd)	Nominated	
Hit FM Music Awards	2022	Top Ten Singles	"Save Your Tears (Remix)" (with The Weeknd)	Nominated	
Hit FM Music Awards	2025	Female Artist of the Year	Herself	Nominated	
Hit FM Music Awards	2025	Party Anthem of the Year	"Yes, And?"	Won	
Hit FM Music Awards	2025	Top Ten Singles	"Yes, And?"	Nominated	
Hit FM Music Awards	2025	Top Ten Singles	"We Can’t Be Friends (Wait for Your Love)"	Won	
Hito Pop Music Awards	2019	Best Western Song	"Thank U, Next"	Won	
Hito Pop Music Awards	2020	Best Western Song	"Break Up with Your Girlfriend, I’m Bored"	Won	
Hollywood Music in Media Awards	2021	Best Original Song	"Just Look Up" (with Kid Cudi)	Nominated	
Hollywood Music in Media Awards	2021	Onscreen Performance	"Just Look Up" (with Kid Cudi)	Nominated	
Hollywood Music in Media Awards	2024	Onscreen Performance	"Defying Gravity" (with Cynthia Erivo)	Nominated	
Hollywood Music in Media Awards	2025	Best Original Song	"The Girl in the Bubble"	Nominated	
Hollywood Music in Media Awards	2025	Music Performance / Special Program	Wicked: One Wonderful Night	Won	
Hollywood Music Video Awards	2025	Best Directing	"We Can't Be Friends (Wait for Your Love)"	Won	
Hollywood Music Video Awards	2025	Video of the Year	"We Can't Be Friends (Wait for Your Love)"	Nominated	
Hollywood Music Video Awards	2025	Best Pop	"We Can't Be Friends (Wait for Your Love)"	Nominated	
Hollywood Music Video Awards	2025	Best Concept	"We Can't Be Friends (Wait for Your Love)"	Nominated	
Hollywood Music Video Awards	2025	Best Acting	"We Can't Be Friends (Wait for Your Love)"	Nominated	
Hollywood Music Video Awards	2025	Best Choreography	"Yes, And?"	Nominated	
Hollywood Music Video Awards	2026	Best Action	"Supernatural"	Nominated	
Hollywood Music Video Awards	2026	Best Production Design	"Supernatural"	Won	
Hollywood Music Video Awards	2026	Best Visual Effects	"Supernatural"	Nominated	
Houston Film Critics Society	2022	Best Original Song	"Just Look Up" (with Kid Cudi)	Nominated	
Houston Film Critics Society	2025	Best Supporting Actress	Wicked	Nominated	
Houston Film Critics Society	2025	Best Ensemble Cast	Wicked	Nominated	
Houston Film Critics Society	2026	Best Supporting Actress	Wicked: For Good	Nominated	
iHeartRadio MMVAs	2015	Best International Artist	Herself	Nominated	
iHeartRadio MMVAs	2016	iHeartRadio International Artist of the Year	Herself	Nominated	
iHeartRadio MMVAs	2018	Video of the Year	"No Tears Left to Cry"	Nominated	
iHeartRadio MMVAs	2018	Fan Fave Single	"No Tears Left to Cry"	Nominated	
iHeartRadio Music Awards	2014	Young Influencer Award	Herself	Won	
iHeartRadio Music Awards	2014	Best Fan Army	Herself	Nominated	
iHeartRadio Music Awards	2014	Instagram Award	Herself	Nominated	
iHeartRadio Music Awards	2015	Artist of the Year	Herself	Nominated	
iHeartRadio Music Awards	2015	Best Collaboration	"Bang Bang" (with Jessie J and Nicki Minaj)	Won	
iHeartRadio Music Awards	2015	Best Collaboration	"Problem" (featuring Iggy Azalea)	Nominated	
iHeartRadio Music Awards	2015	Best Fan Army	Herself	Nominated	
iHeartRadio Music Awards	2016	Best Fan Army	Herself	Nominated	
iHeartRadio Music Awards	2017	Female Artist of the Year	Herself	Nominated	
iHeartRadio Music Awards	2017	Best Cover Song	"How Will I Know"	Nominated	
iHeartRadio Music Awards	2017	Best Music Video	"Side to Side" (featuring Nicki Minaj)	Nominated	
iHeartRadio Music Awards	2017	Best Fan Army	Herself	Nominated	
iHeartRadio Music Awards	2018	Best Fan Army	Herself	Nominated	
iHeartRadio Music Awards	2018	Cutest Musician's Pet	Toulouse	Won	
iHeartRadio Music Awards	2019	Cutest Musician's Pet	Piggy Smallz	Nominated	
iHeartRadio Music Awards	2019	Pop Album of the Year	Sweetener	Won	
iHeartRadio Music Awards	2019	Artist of the Year	Herself	Won	
iHeartRadio Music Awards	2019	Female Artist of the Year	Herself	Won	
iHeartRadio Music Awards	2019	Best Fan Army	Herself	Nominated	
iHeartRadio Music Awards	2019	Best Cover Song	"(You Make Me Feel Like) A Natural Woman"	Nominated	
iHeartRadio Music Awards	2019	Best Lyric	"Thank U, Next”	Nominated	
iHeartRadio Music Awards	2019	Best Music Video	"Thank U, Next”	Nominated	
iHeartRadio Music Awards	2019	Song That Left Us Shook	"Thank U, Next”	Nominated	
iHeartRadio Music Awards	2020	Best Remix	"Good as Hell (Remix)" (with Lizzo)	Nominated	
iHeartRadio Music Awards	2020	Female Artist of the Year	Herself	Nominated	
iHeartRadio Music Awards	2020	Best Fan Army	Herself	Nominated	
iHeartRadio Music Awards	2020	Best Lyrics	"7 Rings”	Nominated	
iHeartRadio Music Awards	2020	Best Music Video	"7 Rings”	Nominated	
iHeartRadio Music Awards	2021	Female Artist of the Year	Herself	Nominated	
iHeartRadio Music Awards	2021	Best Fan Army	Herself	Nominated	
iHeartRadio Music Awards	2021	Best Music Video	"Rain on Me" (with Lady Gaga)	Nominated	
iHeartRadio Music Awards	2021	Dance Song of the Year	"Rain on Me" (with Lady Gaga)	Nominated	
iHeartRadio Music Awards	2022	Female Artist of the Year	Herself	Nominated	
iHeartRadio Music Awards	2022	Song of the Year	"Positions"	Nominated	
iHeartRadio Music Awards	2022	Best Fan Army	Herself	Nominated	
iHeartRadio Music Awards	2025	Favorite Soundtrack	Wicked: The Soundtrack	Won	
iHeartRadio Music Awards	2025	Best Lyrics	"We Can't Be Friends (Wait for Your Love)"	Nominated	
iHeartRadio Music Awards	2026	Favorite Soundtrack	Wicked: For Good - The Soundtrack	Nominated	
iHeartRadio Music Awards	2026	Favorite On Screen	Herself and Cynthia Erivo, Wicked: For Good	Nominated	
iHeartRadio Titanium Award	2019	1 Billion Total Audience Spins on iHeartRadio Stations	"Breathin"	Won	
iHeartRadio Titanium Award	2019	1 Billion Total Audience Spins on iHeartRadio Stations	"No Tears Left to Cry"	Won	
iHeartRadio Titanium Award	2020	1 Billion Total Audience Spins on iHeartRadio Stations	"Thank U, Next"	Won	
iHeartRadio Titanium Award	2020	1 Billion Total Audience Spins on iHeartRadio Stations	"7 Rings"	Won	
iHeartRadio Titanium Award	2021	1 Billion Total Audience Spins on iHeartRadio Stations	"Positions"	Won	
InStyle Best Beauty Buys	2023	Best Liquid Eyeliner	r.e.m. beauty by Ariana Grande	Won	
Irish Recorded Music Association Number One Awards	2016	Number One Album	Dangerous Woman	Won	
Irish Recorded Music Association Number One Awards	2018	Number One Album	Sweetener	Won	
Irish Recorded Music Association Number One Awards	2019	Number One Album	Thank U, Next	Won	
Irish Recorded Music Association Number One Awards	2020	Number One Album	Positions	Won	
Irish Recorded Music Association Number One Awards	2024	Number One Album	Eternal Sunshine	Won	
Irish Recorded Music Association Number One Awards	2026	Number One Album	Petal	Won	
Irish Recorded Music Association Number One Awards	2014	Number One Single	"Problem" (featuring Iggy Azalea)	Won	
Irish Recorded Music Association Number One Awards	2018	Number One Single	"No Tears Left to Cry"	Won	
Irish Recorded Music Association Number One Awards	2018	Number One Single	"Thank U, Next"	Won	
Irish Recorded Music Association Number One Awards	2019	Number One Single	"7 Rings"	Won	
Irish Recorded Music Association Number One Awards	2019	Number One Single	"Break Up with Your Girlfriend, I’m Bored"	Won	
Irish Recorded Music Association Number One Awards	2020	Number One Single	"Rain on Me" (with Lady Gaga)	Won	
Irish Recorded Music Association Number One Awards	2020	Number One Single	"Positions"	Won	
Japan Gold Disc Awards	2015	New Artist of the Year (International)	Herself	Won	
Japan Gold Disc Awards	2015	Best 3 New Artists (International)	Herself	Won	
Japan Gold Disc Awards	2015	Best 3 Albums (International)	My Everything	Won	
Japan Gold Disc Awards	2017	International Artist of the Year	Herself	Won	
Japan Gold Disc Awards	2017	International Album of the Year	Dangerous Woman	Won	
Japan Gold Disc Awards	2017	Best 3 Albums (International)	Dangerous Woman	Won	
Japan Gold Disc Awards	2019	Best 3 Albums (International)	Sweetener	Won	
JIM Awards	2015	Best Female International	Herself	Won	
JIM Awards	2015	Hottie of the Year	Herself	Nominated	
Joox Malaysia Top Music Awards	2020	Top 5 International Hits (Mid-Year)	"Stuck with U" (with Justin Bieber)	Won	
Joox Malaysia Top Music Awards	2020	Most Popular International	"Stuck with U" (with Justin Bieber)	Won	
Joox Malaysia Top Music Awards	2021	Top 5 International Hits of the Year (2020)	"Stuck with U" (with Justin Bieber)	Won	
Joox Malaysia Top Music Awards	2021	Top 5 International Artists (2020 Year-End)	Herself	Won	
Joox Malaysia Top Music Awards	2021	Top 5 International Artists of the Year (2020)	Herself	Won	
Joox Malaysia Top Music Awards	2021	Top 5 International Artists (Mid-Year)	Herself	Won	
Joox Malaysia Top Music Awards	2022	Top 5 International Artists (2021 Year-End)	Herself	Won	
Joox Thailand Music Awards	2019	International Artist of the Year	Herself	Nominated	
Joox Thailand Music Awards	2020	International Artist of the Year	Herself	Won	
Juno Awards	2017	International Album of the Year	Dangerous Woman	Nominated	
Juno Awards	2020	International Album of the Year	Thank U, Next	Nominated	
Kansas City Film Critics Circle	2024	Best Supporting Actress	Wicked	Nominated	
KKBox Music Awards	2025	Top 100 artists	Herself	Won	
Las Culturistas Culture Awards	2023	Allison Williams Cool Girl Award	Herself	Won	
Las Culturistas Culture Awards	2024	Eva Longoria Award for Tiny Woman, Huge Impact	Herself	Nominated	
Las Culturistas Culture Awards	2025	Most iconic exchange of words	Herself & Cynthia Erivo	Nominated	
Las Culturistas Culture Awards	2025	Best crier	Galinda Upland - Wicked	Nominated	
Las Vegas Film Critics Society	2024	Best Supporting Actress	Wicked	Nominated	
Las Vegas Film Critics Society	2024	Best Ensemble	Wicked	Nominated	
Las Vegas Film Critics Society	2025	Best Supporting Actress	Wicked: For Good	Nominated	
LOS40 Music Awards	2014	Best Breakthrough Artist in 40 Principales	Herself	Nominated	
LOS40 Music Awards	2017	Lo + 40 Artist Award	Herself	Nominated	
LOS40 Music Awards	2019	Best International Album	Thank U, Next	Nominated	
LOS40 Music Awards	2020	Best International Video	"Rain on Me" (with Lady Gaga)	Nominated	
LOS40 Music Awards	2021	Best International Album	Positions	Nominated	
LOS40 Music Awards	2024	Best International Album	Eternal Sunshine	Nominated	
Love Perfume Awards	2015	Best Celebrity Launch	Ariana Grande Ari	Won	
Love Perfume Awards	2019	Best Celebrity Launch	Ariana Grande Cloud	Won	
Love Perfume Awards	2021	Best Celebrity Launch	Ariana Grande R.E.M.	Won	
Love Perfume Awards	2022	Best Celebrity Launch	Ariana Grande God is a woman	Won	
Love Perfume Awards	2023	Best Celebrity Launch	Ariana Grande Cloud 2.0	Won	
Love Perfume Awards	2024	Best Celebrity Launch	Ariana Grande Cloud Pink	Won	
Love Perfume Awards	2025	Best Celebrity Launch	Ariana Grande R.E.M Cherry Eclipse	Won	
Love Perfume Awards	2025	Best Celebrity Launch	Ariana Grande Love Notes	Nominated	
Lunas del Auditorio	2016	Best Foreign Language Pop Artist	Herself	Nominated	
Lunas del Auditorio	2018	Best Foreign Language Pop Artist	Herself	Nominated	
Melon Music Awards	2019	Top 10 Artists	Herself	Nominated	
Melon Music Awards	2024	Best Pop Artist	Herself	Nominated	
MTV Digital Days Awards	2016	Insta Queen	Herself	Won	
MTV Europe Music Awards	2013	Artist on the Rise	Herself	Nominated	
MTV Europe Music Awards	2014	Best Song	"Problem" (featuring Iggy Azalea)	Won	
MTV Europe Music Awards	2014	Best Pop	Herself	Nominated	
MTV Europe Music Awards	2014	Best Female Artist	Herself	Won	
MTV Europe Music Awards	2014	Best New Artist	Herself	Nominated	
MTV Europe Music Awards	2014	Best Push Act	Herself	Nominated	
MTV Europe Music Awards	2014	Biggest Fans	Herself	Nominated	
MTV Europe Music Awards	2015	Best Pop	Herself	Nominated	
MTV Europe Music Awards	2016	Best Pop	Herself	Nominated	
MTV Europe Music Awards	2016	Best US Act	Herself	Won	
MTV Europe Music Awards	2016	Biggest Fans	Herself	Nominated	
MTV Europe Music Awards	2016	Worldwide Act	Herself	Nominated	
MTV Europe Music Awards	2017	Best Artist	Herself	Nominated	
MTV Europe Music Awards	2017	Biggest Fans	Herself	Nominated	
MTV Europe Music Awards	2018	Best Artist	Herself	Nominated	
MTV Europe Music Awards	2018	Best Pop	Herself	Nominated	
MTV Europe Music Awards	2018	Best US Act	Herself	Nominated	
MTV Europe Music Awards	2018	Best Video	"No Tears Left to Cry"	Nominated	
MTV Europe Music Awards	2018	Best Song	"No Tears Left to Cry"	Nominated	
MTV Europe Music Awards	2019	Best Artist	Herself	Nominated	
MTV Europe Music Awards	2019	Best Pop	Herself	Nominated	
MTV Europe Music Awards	2019	Best Live	Herself	Nominated	
MTV Europe Music Awards	2019	Biggest Fans	Herself	Nominated	
MTV Europe Music Awards	2019	Best US Act	Herself	Nominated	
MTV Europe Music Awards	2019	Best Song	"7 Rings"	Nominated	
MTV Europe Music Awards	2019	Best Video	"Thank U, Next"	Nominated	
MTV Europe Music Awards	2020	Best Video	"Rain on Me" (with Lady Gaga)	Nominated	
MTV Europe Music Awards	2020	Best Song	"Rain on Me" (with Lady Gaga)	Nominated	
MTV Europe Music Awards	2020	Best Collaboration	"Rain on Me" (with Lady Gaga)	Nominated	
MTV Europe Music Awards	2020	Biggest Fans	Herself	Nominated	
MTV Europe Music Awards	2021	Biggest Fans	Herself	Nominated	
MTV Europe Music Awards	2021	Best US Act	Herself	Nominated	
MTV Europe Music Awards	2021	Best Collaboration	"Save Your Tears (Remix)" (with The Weeknd)	Nominated	
MTV Europe Music Awards	2024	Best Pop	Herself	Won	
MTV Europe Music Awards	2024	Best US Act	Herself	Nominated	
MTV Europe Music Awards	2024	Biggest Fans	Herself	Nominated	
MTV Europe Music Awards	2024	Best Song	"We Can't Be Friends (Wait for Your Love)"	Nominated	
MTV Europe Music Awards	2024	Best Video	"We Can't Be Friends (Wait for Your Love)"	Nominated	
MTV Italian Music Awards	2015	Wonder Woman	Herself	Nominated	
MTV Italian Music Awards	2015	MTV Awards Star	Herself	Nominated	
MTV Italian Music Awards	2016	Best International Female	Herself	Won	
MTV Italian Music Awards	2017	Best International Female	Herself	Won	
MTV Millennial Awards	2014	International Hit of the Year	"Problem" (featuring Iggy Azalea)	Nominated	
MTV Millennial Awards	2015	Global Instagramer of the Year	Herself	Won	
MTV Millennial Awards	2015	International Hit of the Year	"One Last Time"	Won	
MTV Millennial Awards	2016	Global Snapchat of the Year	Herself	Won	
MTV Millennial Awards	2016	Fail of the Year	Herself	Nominated	
MTV Millennial Awards	2017	Global Instagramer	Herself	Nominated	
MTV Millennial Awards	2019	Global Instagramer	Herself	Nominated	
MTV Millennial Awards	2019	Fandom	Herself	Nominated	
MTV Millennial Awards	2019	#InstaPets	Piggy Smallz	Nominated	
MTV Millennial Awards	2019	Global Hit	"Thank U, Next"	Nominated	
MTV Millennial Awards Brazil	2019	Global Hit	"Thank U, Next"	Nominated	
MTV Millennial Awards Brazil	2019	Fandom of the Year	Herself	Nominated	
MTV Millennial Awards Brazil	2019	Pet of the Year	Piggy Smallz	Nominated	
MTV Millennial Awards Brazil	2020	International Collaboration	"Stuck with U" (with Justin Bieber)	Nominated	
MTV Millennial Awards Brazil	2020	International Collaboration	"Rain on Me" (with Lady Gaga)	Nominated	
MTV Millennial Awards Brazil	2020	Global Hit	"Rain on Me" (with Lady Gaga)	Won	
MTV Millennial Awards Brazil	2021	Global Hit	"Positions"	Nominated	
MTV Millennial Awards Brazil	2021	International Collaboration	"Save Your Tears (Remix)" (with The Weeknd)	Nominated	
MTV Movie & TV Awards	2017	Best Musical Moment	"Beauty and the Beast" (with John Legend)	Nominated	
MTV Movie & TV Awards	2017	Best Musical Moment	"You Can't Stop the Beat" (with the cast of Hairspray Live!)	Nominated	
MTV Movie & TV Awards	2021	Best Music Documentary	Ariana Grande: Excuse Me, I Love You	Nominated	
MTV Movie & TV Awards	2022	Best Song	"Just Look Up" (with Kid Cudi)	Nominated	
MTV Video Music Awards	2014	Best Female Video	"Problem" (featuring Iggy Azalea)	Nominated	
MTV Video Music Awards	2014	Best Pop Video	"Problem" (featuring Iggy Azalea)	Won	
MTV Video Music Awards	2014	Best Lyric Video	"Problem" (featuring Iggy Azalea)	Nominated	
MTV Video Music Awards	2014	Best Collaboration	"Problem" (featuring Iggy Azalea)	Nominated	
MTV Video Music Awards	2015	Best Collaboration	"Love Me Harder" (with The Weeknd)	Nominated	
MTV Video Music Awards	2015	Best Collaboration	"Bang Bang" (with Jessie J and Nicki Minaj)	Nominated	
MTV Video Music Awards	2016	Best Collaboration	"Let Me Love You" (featuring Lil Wayne)	Nominated	
MTV Video Music Awards	2016	Best Female Video	"Into You"	Nominated	
MTV Video Music Awards	2016	Best Pop Video	"Into You"	Nominated	
MTV Video Music Awards	2016	Best Editing	"Into You"	Nominated	
MTV Video Music Awards	2016	Best Cinematography	"Into You"	Nominated	
MTV Video Music Awards	2017	Best Choreography	"Side to Side" (featuring Nicki Minaj)	Nominated	
MTV Video Music Awards	2017	Artist of the Year	Herself	Nominated	
MTV Video Music Awards	2018	Artist of the Year	Herself	Nominated	
MTV Video Music Awards	2018	Video of the Year	"No Tears Left to Cry"	Nominated	
MTV Video Music Awards	2018	Best Pop	"No Tears Left to Cry"	Won	
MTV Video Music Awards	2018	Best Cinematography	"No Tears Left to Cry"	Nominated	
MTV Video Music Awards	2018	Best Visual Effects	"No Tears Left to Cry"	Nominated	
MTV Video Music Awards	2019	Video of the Year	"Thank U, Next"	Nominated	
MTV Video Music Awards	2019	Song of the Year	"Thank U, Next"	Nominated	
MTV Video Music Awards	2019	Best Pop	"Thank U, Next"	Nominated	
MTV Video Music Awards	2019	Best Direction	"Thank U, Next"	Nominated	
MTV Video Music Awards	2019	Best Cinematography	"Thank U, Next"	Nominated	
MTV Video Music Awards	2019	Best Editing	"7 Rings"	Nominated	
MTV Video Music Awards	2019	Best Art Direction	"7 Rings"	Won	
MTV Video Music Awards	2019	Best Power Anthem	"7 Rings"	Nominated	
MTV Video Music Awards	2019	Song of Summer	"Boyfriend" (with Social House)	Won	
MTV Video Music Awards	2019	Best Hip-Hop	"Rule the World" (with 2 Chainz)	Nominated	
MTV Video Music Awards	2019	Best Visual Effects	"God Is a Woman"	Nominated	
MTV Video Music Awards	2019	Artist of the Year	Herself	Won	
MTV Video Music Awards	2020	Video of the Year	"Rain on Me" (with Lady Gaga)	Nominated	
MTV Video Music Awards	2020	Song of the Year	"Rain on Me" (with Lady Gaga)	Won	
MTV Video Music Awards	2020	Best Pop	"Rain on Me" (with Lady Gaga)	Nominated	
MTV Video Music Awards	2020	Best Cinematography	"Rain on Me" (with Lady Gaga)	Won	
MTV Video Music Awards	2020	Best Visual Effects	"Rain on Me" (with Lady Gaga)	Nominated	
MTV Video Music Awards	2020	Best Choreography	"Rain on Me" (with Lady Gaga)	Nominated	
MTV Video Music Awards	2020	Best Collaboration	"Rain on Me" (with Lady Gaga)	Won	
MTV Video Music Awards	2020	Best Collaboration	"Stuck with U" (with Justin Bieber)	Nominated	
MTV Video Music Awards	2020	Best Music Video From Home	"Stuck with U" (with Justin Bieber)	Won	
MTV Video Music Awards	2021	Artist of the Year	Herself	Nominated	
MTV Video Music Awards	2021	Best Pop	"Positions"	Nominated	
MTV Video Music Awards	2021	Best Choreography	"34+35"	Nominated	
MTV Video Music Awards	2022	Best Metaverse Performance	Rift Tour ft. Ariana Grande (Fortnite)	Nominated	
MTV Video Music Awards	2024	Video of the Year	"We Can’t Be Friends (Wait for Your Love)"	Nominated	
MTV Video Music Awards	2024	Best Direction	"We Can’t Be Friends (Wait for Your Love)"	Nominated	
MTV Video Music Awards	2024	Best Cinematography	"We Can’t Be Friends (Wait for Your Love)"	Won	
MTV Video Music Awards	2024	Best Editing	"We Can’t Be Friends (Wait for Your Love)"	Nominated	
MTV Video Music Awards	2024	Best Visual Effects	"The Boy is Mine"	Nominated	
MTV Video Music Awards	2024	Artist of the Year	Herself	Nominated	
MTV Video Music Awards	2024	Song of Summer	We Can’t Be Friends (Wait for Your Love)"	Nominated	
MTV Video Music Awards	2025	Best Pop Artist	Herself	Nominated	
MTV Video Music Awards	2025	Video of the Year	Brighter Days Ahead	Won	
MTV Video Music Awards	2025	Best Long Form Video	Brighter Days Ahead	Won	
MTV Video Music Awards	2025	Best Pop	Brighter Days Ahead	Won	
MTV Video Music Awards	2025	Best Direction	Brighter Days Ahead	Nominated	
MTV Video Music Awards	2025	Best Cinematography	Brighter Days Ahead	Nominated	
MTV Video Music Awards	2025	Best Visual Effects	Brighter Days Ahead	Nominated	
MTV Video Music Awards	2026	Artist of the Year	Herself	Nominated	
MTV Video Music Awards	2026	Video of the Year	"Hate That I Made You Love Me"	Nominated	
MTV Video Music Awards	2026	Best Pop	"Hate That I Made You Love Me"	Nominated	
MTV Video Music Awards	2026	Best Direction	"Hate That I Made You Love Me"	Nominated	
MTV Video Music Awards	2026	Best Cinematography	"Hate That I Made You Love Me"	Nominated	
MTV Video Music Awards	2026	Best Editing	"Hate That I Made You Love Me"	Nominated	
MTV Video Music Awards	2026	Best Visual Effects	"Hate That I Made You Love Me"	Won	
MTV Video Music Awards	2026	Song of Summer	"Hate That I Made You Love Me"	Won	
MTV Video Music Awards Japan	2014	Best New Artist Video	"Baby I"	Won	
MTV Video Music Awards Japan	2015	Best Female Video	"Problem" (featuring Iggy Azalea)	Won	
MTV Video Music Awards Japan	2016	Best Female Video	"Into You"	Won	
MTV Video Music Awards Japan	2016	Best Pop Video	"Into You"	Nominated	
MTV Video Music Awards Japan	2018	Best Female Video - International	"No Tears Left to Cry"	Won	
MTV Video Play Awards	2014	Winning Videos	"Problem" (featuring Iggy Azalea)	Won	
MTV Video Play Awards	2018	Winning Videos	"No Tears Left to Cry"	Won	
MTV Video Play Awards	2019	Winning Videos	"7 Rings"	Won	
MTV Video Play Awards	2019	Winning Videos	"Thank U, Next"	Won	
MTV Video Play Awards	2020	Winning Videos	"Rain on Me" (with Lady Gaga)	Won	
Music Awards Japan	2025	Best International R&B/Contemporary Song in Japan	"We Can't Be Friends (Wait for Your Love)"	Won	
Music Business Association	2013	New Artist of the Year	Herself	Won	
Music Choice Awards	2013	New Artist of the Year	Herself	Won	
MusicDaily Awards	2021	Best Collab	"34+35 (Remix)" (featuring Doja Cat and Megan Thee Stallion)	Won	
Myx Music Awards	2016	Favorite International Video	"One Last Time"	Nominated	
Myx Music Awards	2019	Favorite International Video	"Thank U, Next"	Nominated	
Myx Music Awards	2020	Favorite International Video	"7 Rings"	Nominated	
Myx Music Awards	2021	Favorite International Video	"Rain on Me" (with Lady Gaga)	Nominated	
Myx Music Awards	2024	Global Video of the Year	"We Can't Be Friends (Wait for Your Love)"	Nominated	
NAACP Image Awards	2014	Outstanding New Artist	Herself	Nominated	
NAACP Image Awards	2025	Outstanding Ensemble Cast in a Motion Picture	Wicked	Nominated	
NAACP Image Awards	2026	Outstanding Ensemble Cast in a Motion Picture	Wicked: For Good	Nominated	
NAACP Image Awards	2026	Outstanding Duo, Group or Collaboration (Traditional)	"For Good" (with Cynthia Erivo)	Nominated	
National Board of Review	2025	Spotlight Award	Creative Collaboration of Cynthia Erivo & Herself	Won	
National Youth Theatre Awards	2009	Outstanding Featured Actress in a Musical	Charlotte	Won	
Neox Fan Awards	2014	Best New Act of the Year	Herself	Nominated	
New Music Awards	2015	Top40 Female Artist of the Year	Herself	Won	
New Music Awards	2015	Top40 Breakthrough Artist of the Year	Herself	Won	
New Music Awards	2019	AC Female Artist of the Year	Herself	Won	
New Music Awards	2021	Top 40 Group of the Year	Herself	Won	
New Music Awards	2022	Top40 Female Artist of the Year	Herself	Nominated	
New Music Awards	2025	Top40 Female Artist of the Year	Herself	Nominated	
New York Film Critics Online	2024	Best Supporting Actress	Wicked	Nominated	
New York Film Critics Online	2024	Ensemble Cast	Wicked	Nominated	
New York Film Critics Online	2025	Best Supporting Actress	Wicked: For Good	Nominated	
Nickelodeon Kids' Choice Awards	2014	Favorite TV Actress	Sam & Cat	Won	
Nickelodeon Kids' Choice Awards	2015	Favorite Female Artist	Herself	Nominated	
Nickelodeon Kids' Choice Awards	2015	Song of the Year	"Bang Bang" (with Jessie J and Nicki Minaj)	Won	
Nickelodeon Kids' Choice Awards	2015	Song of the Year	"Problem" (featuring Iggy Azalea)	Nominated	
Nickelodeon Kids' Choice Awards	2016	Favorite Female Artist	Herself	Won	
Nickelodeon Kids' Choice Awards	2017	Favorite Female Artist	Herself	Nominated	
Nickelodeon Kids' Choice Awards	2017	Favorite Song	"Side to Side" (featuring Nicki Minaj)	Nominated	
Nickelodeon Kids' Choice Awards	2019	Favorite Song	"Thank U, Next"	Won	
Nickelodeon Kids' Choice Awards	2019	Favorite Female Artist	Herself	Won	
Nickelodeon Kids' Choice Awards	2020	Favorite Song	"7 Rings"	Nominated	
Nickelodeon Kids' Choice Awards	2020	Favorite Female Artist	Herself	Won	
Nickelodeon Kids' Choice Awards	2021	Favorite Female Artist	Herself	Won	
Nickelodeon Kids' Choice Awards	2021	Favorite Music Collaboration	"Rain on Me" (with Lady Gaga)	Nominated	
Nickelodeon Kids' Choice Awards	2021	Favorite Music Collaboration	"Stuck with U" (with Justin Bieber)	Won	
Nickelodeon Kids' Choice Awards	2022	Favorite Female Artist	Herself	Won	
Nickelodeon Kids' Choice Awards	2022	Favorite Music Collaboration	"Save Your Tears (Remix)" (with The Weeknd)	Nominated	
Nickelodeon Kids' Choice Awards	2023	Favorite Celebrity Pet	Toulouse Grande	Nominated	
Nickelodeon Kids' Choice Awards	2024	Favorite Female Artist	Herself	Nominated	
Nickelodeon Kids' Choice Awards	2024	Favorite Song	"Yes, And?"	Nominated	
Nickelodeon Kids' Choice Awards	2025	Favorite Movie Actress	Wicked	Won	
Nickelodeon Kids' Choice Awards	2025	Favorite Female Artist	Herself	Nominated	
Nickelodeon Kids' Choice Awards	2025	Favorite Song From a Movie	"Defying Gravity" (with Cynthia Erivo)	Won	
Nickelodeon Kids' Choice Awards	2025	Favorite Song From a Movie	"Popular"	Nominated	
Nickelodeon Kids' Choice Awards	2026	Favorite Movie Actress	Wicked: For Good	Nominated	
Nickelodeon Kids' Choice Awards	2026	Favorite Female Artist	Herself	Nominated	
Nickelodeon Kids' Choice Awards	2026	Favorite Song	"Hate That I Made You Love Me"	Nominated	
Nickelodeon Kids' Choice Awards	2026	Favorite Song from a Movie	"For Good" (with Cynthia Erivo)	Nominated	
Nickelodeon Kids' Choice Awards	2026	Favorite On-Screen Duo/Trio	Herself and Cynthia Erivo, Wicked: For Good	Nominated	
Meus Prêmios Nick	2014	Favorite International Artist	Herself	Nominated	
Meus Prêmios Nick	2014	Favorite Fandom	Herself	Nominated	
Meus Prêmios Nick	2015	Favorite International Artist	Herself	Nominated	
Meus Prêmios Nick	2016	Favorite International Artist	Herself	Nominated	
Meus Prêmios Nick	2017	Favorite International Artist	Herself	Nominated	
Meus Prêmios Nick	2017	International Show of the Year in Brazil	Dangerous Woman Tour	Nominated	
Meus Prêmios Nick	2017	Favorite International Instagrammer	Herself	Won	
Meus Prêmios Nick	2018	Favorite International Artist	Herself	Won	
Meus Prêmios Nick	2019	Favorite International Artist	Herself	Nominated	
Nickelodeon Argentina Kids' Choice Awards	2014	Favorite International Artist or Group	Herself	Won	
Nickelodeon Argentina Kids' Choice Awards	2015	Favorite International Artist or Group	Herself	Won	
Nickelodeon Argentina Kids' Choice Awards	2016	Favorite International Artist or Group	Herself	Nominated	
Nickelodeon Argentina Kids' Choice Awards	2018	Favorite International Artist or Group	Herself	Nominated	
Nickelodeon Australian Kids' Choice Awards	2013	Aussie's Fave Nick Star	Victorious	Nominated	
Nickelodeon Australian Kids' Choice Awards	2014	Aussies’ Fave Hottie	Herself	Nominated	
Nickelodeon Australian Kids' Choice Awards	2015	Aussie/Kiwi's Favourite Fan Army	Herself	Nominated	
Nickelodeon Colombia Kids' Choice Awards	2014	Favorite International Artist or Group	Herself	Nominated	
Nickelodeon Colombia Kids' Choice Awards	2015	Favorite International Artist or Group	Herself	Nominated	
Nickelodeon Colombia Kids' Choice Awards	2016	Favorite International Artist or Group	Herself	Won	
Nickelodeon Colombia Kids' Choice Awards	2017	Favorite International Artist or Group	Herself	Nominated	
Nickelodeon Colombia Kids' Choice Awards	2017	Best Fandom	Herself	Nominated	
Nickelodeon Mexico Kids' Choice Awards	2014	Favorite International Artist or Group	Herself	Won	
Nickelodeon Mexico Kids' Choice Awards	2015	Favorite International Artist or Group	Herself	Nominated	
Nickelodeon Mexico Kids' Choice Awards	2016	Favorite International Artist or Group	Herself	Nominated	
Nickelodeon Mexico Kids' Choice Awards	2018	Favorite International Artist or Group	Herself	Nominated	
Nickelodeon Mexico Kids' Choice Awards	2018	Favorite Hit	"No Tears Left to Cry"	Nominated	
Nickelodeon Mexico Kids' Choice Awards	2019	Favorite International Artist or Group	Herself	Nominated	
Nickelodeon UK Kids' Choice Awards	2013	UK Favourite Fan Family	Herself	Nominated	
NME Awards	2018	Hero of the Year	Herself	Won	
NME Awards	2018	Music Moment of the Year	One Love Manchester	Won	
Now That's What I Call Music! Awards	2018	Best Now – Collaboration	"Bang Bang" (with Jessie J and Nicki Minaj)	Nominated	
NRJ Music Awards	2014	International Breakthrough of the Year	Herself	Won	
NRJ Music Awards	2014	International Song of the Year	"Problem" (featuring Iggy Azalea)	Nominated	
NRJ Music Awards	2015	International Female Artist	Herself	Nominated	
NRJ Music Awards	2018	International Female Artist	Herself	Won	
NRJ Music Awards	2018	International Song of the Year	"No Tears Left to Cry"	Nominated	
NRJ Music Awards	2018	Video of the Year	"No Tears Left to Cry"	Nominated	
NRJ Music Awards	2019	International Female Artist	Herself	Won	
NRJ Music Awards	2020	Collaboration of the Year	"Rain on Me" (with Lady Gaga)	Won	
NRJ Music Awards	2020	Video of the Year	"Rain on Me" (with Lady Gaga)	Nominated	
NRJ Music Awards	2021	International Collaboration of the Year	"Save Your Tears (Remix)" (with The Weeknd)	Nominated	
NRJ Music Awards	2026	International Female Artist	Herself	Nominated	
Official Number One Awards (Note: The Number One Award for singles was first introduced by the Official Charts Company (OCC) in December 2011, followed by the introduction of the Number One Award for albums in 2015.)	2014	Number One Single	"Problem" (featuring Iggy Azalea)	Won	
Official Number One Awards	2014	Number One Single	"Bang Bang" (with Jessie J and Nicki Minaj)	Won	
Official Number One Awards	2018	Number One Single	"Thank U, Next"	Won	
Official Number One Awards	2019	Number One Single	"7 Rings"	Won	
Official Number One Awards	2019	Number One Single	"Break Up with Your Girlfriend, I’m Bored"	Won	
Official Number One Awards	2020	Number One Single	"Rain on Me" (with Lady Gaga)	Won	
Official Number One Awards	2020	Number One Single	"Positions"	Won	
Official Number One Awards	2026	Number One Single	"Hate That I Made You Love Me"	Won	
Official Number One Awards	2016	Number One Album	Dangerous Woman	Won	
Official Number One Awards	2018	Number One Album	Sweetener	Won	
Official Number One Awards	2019	Number One Album	Thank U, Next	Won	
Official Number One Awards	2020	Number One Album	Positions	Won	
Official Number One Awards	2024	Number One Album	Eternal Sunshine	Won	
Official Number One Awards	2026	Number One Album	Petal	Won	
The Official Charts Specialist Number One Awards (Note: The Specialist Number One Awards were launched in January 2021. These awards recognize all number one albums and singles that have reached the top of any OCC chart, excluding the Official Singles and Official Albums charts, for any prior years.)	2014	Official Singles Streaming Chart	"Problem" (featuring Iggy Azalea)	Won	
The Official Charts Specialist Number One Awards	2014	Official Singles Audio Streaming Chart	"Problem" (featuring Iggy Azalea)	Won	
The Official Charts Specialist Number One Awards	2014	Official Singles Video Streaming Chart	"Problem" (featuring Iggy Azalea)	Won	
The Official Charts Specialist Number One Awards	2014	Official Singles Sales Chart	"Problem" (featuring Iggy Azalea)	Won	
The Official Charts Specialist Number One Awards	2014	Official Singles Sales Chart	"Bang Bang" (with Jessie J and Nicki Minaj)	Won	
The Official Charts Specialist Number One Awards	2014	Official Singles Downloads Chart	"Problem" (featuring Iggy Azalea)	Won	
The Official Charts Specialist Number One Awards	2014	Official Singles Downloads Chart	"Bang Bang" (with Jessie J and Nicki Minaj)	Won	
The Official Charts Specialist Number One Awards	2014	Official Scottish Singles Sales Chart	"Problem" (featuring Iggy Azalea)	Won	
The Official Charts Specialist Number One Awards	2014	Official Scottish Singles Sales Chart	"Bang Bang" (with Jessie J and Nicki Minaj)	Won	
The Official Charts Specialist Number One Awards	2016	Official Album Downloads Chart	Dangerous Woman	Won	
The Official Charts Specialist Number One Awards	2017	Official Singles Sales Chart	"One Last Time"	Won	
The Official Charts Specialist Number One Awards	2017	Official Singles Downloads Chart	"One Last Time"	Won	
The Official Charts Specialist Number One Awards	2017	Official Scottish Singles Sales Chart	"One Last Time"	Won	
The Official Charts Specialist Number One Awards	2018	Official Streaming Chart	"No Tears Left to Cry"	Won	
The Official Charts Specialist Number One Awards	2018	Official Streaming Chart	"Thank U, Next"	Won	
The Official Charts Specialist Number One Awards	2018	Official Video Streaming Chart	"No Tears Left to Cry"	Won	
The Official Charts Specialist Number One Awards	2018	Official Video Streaming Chart	"Thank U, Next"	Won	
The Official Charts Specialist Number One Awards	2018	Official Singles Sales Chart	"No Tears Left to Cry"	Won	
The Official Charts Specialist Number One Awards	2018	Official Singles Sales Chart	"Thank U, Next"	Won	
The Official Charts Specialist Number One Awards	2018	Official Singles Downloads Chart	"No Tears Left to Cry"	Won	
The Official Charts Specialist Number One Awards	2018	Official Singles Downloads Chart	"Thank U, Next"	Won	
The Official Charts Specialist Number One Awards	2018	Official Singles Audio Streaming Chart	"Thank U, Next"	Won	
The Official Charts Specialist Number One Awards	2018	Official Scottish Albums Chart	Sweetener	Won	
The Official Charts Specialist Number One Awards	2018	Official Albums Streaming Chart	Sweetener	Won	
The Official Charts Specialist Number One Awards	2018	Official Albums Sales Chart	Sweetener	Won	
The Official Charts Specialist Number One Awards	2018	Official Album Downloads Chart	Sweetener	Won	
The Official Charts Specialist Number One Awards	2018	Official Physical Albums Chart	Sweetener	Won	
The Official Charts Specialist Number One Awards	2019	Official Singles Streaming Chart	"7 Rings"	Won	
The Official Charts Specialist Number One Awards	2019	Official Singles Streaming Chart	"Break Up with Your Girlfriend, I'm Bored"	Won	
The Official Charts Specialist Number One Awards	2019	Official Singles Audio Streaming Chart	"7 Rings"	Won	
The Official Charts Specialist Number One Awards	2019	Official Singles Audio Streaming Chart	"Break Up with Your Girlfriend, I'm Bored"	Won	
The Official Charts Specialist Number One Awards	2019	Official Singles Video Streaming Chart	"7 Rings"	Won	
The Official Charts Specialist Number One Awards	2019	Official Singles Video Streaming Chart	"Break Up with Your Girlfriend, I'm Bored"	Won	
The Official Charts Specialist Number One Awards	2019	Official Singles Sales Chart	"7 Rings"	Won	
The Official Charts Specialist Number One Awards	2019	Official Singles Sales Chart	"Don't Call Me Angel" (with Miley Cyrus and Lana Del Rey)	Won	
The Official Charts Specialist Number One Awards	2019	Official Singles Downloads Chart	"7 Rings"	Won	
The Official Charts Specialist Number One Awards	2019	Official Singles Downloads Chart	"Don't Call Me Angel" (with Miley Cyrus and Lana Del Rey)	Won	
The Official Charts Specialist Number One Awards	2019	Official Scottish Singles Sales Chart	"7 Rings"	Won	
The Official Charts Specialist Number One Awards	2019	Official Scottish Singles Sales Chart	"Don't Call Me Angel" (with Miley Cyrus and Lana Del Rey)	Won	
The Official Charts Specialist Number One Awards	2019	Official Scottish Albums Chart	Thank U, Next	Won	
The Official Charts Specialist Number One Awards	2019	Official Albums Streaming Chart	Thank U, Next	Won	
The Official Charts Specialist Number One Awards	2019	Official Albums Sales Chart	Thank U, Next	Won	
The Official Charts Specialist Number One Awards	2019	Official Album Downloads Chart	Thank U, Next	Won	
The Official Charts Specialist Number One Awards	2019	Official Physical Albums Chart	Thank U, Next	Won	
The Official Charts Specialist Number One Awards	2020	Official Singles Streaming Chart	"Rain on Me"	Won	
The Official Charts Specialist Number One Awards	2020	Official Singles Streaming Chart	"Positions"	Won	
The Official Charts Specialist Number One Awards	2020	Official Singles Audio Streaming Chart	"Positions"	Won	
The Official Charts Specialist Number One Awards	2020	Official Singles Video Streaming Chart	"Rain on Me" (with Lady Gaga)	Won	
The Official Charts Specialist Number One Awards	2020	Official Singles Video Streaming Chart	"Positions"	Won	
The Official Charts Specialist Number One Awards	2020	Official Singles Sales Chart	"Rain on Me" (with Lady Gaga)	Won	
The Official Charts Specialist Number One Awards	2020	Official Singles Downloads Chart	"Rain on Me" (with Lady Gaga)	Won	
The Official Charts Specialist Number One Awards	2020	Official Albums Streaming Chart	Positions	Won	
The Official Charts Specialist Number One Awards	2021	Official Vinyl Albums Chart	Positions	Won	
The Official Charts Specialist Number One Awards	2023	Official Hip Hop and R&B Albums Chart	Yours Truly	Won	
The Official Charts Specialist Number One Awards	2024	Official Video Streaming Chart	"Yes, And?"	Won	
The Official Charts Specialist Number One Awards	2024	Official Video Streaming Chart	"We Can't Be Friends (Wait for Your Love)"	Won	
The Official Charts Specialist Number One Awards	2024	Official Singles Sales Chart	"Yes, And?"	Won	
The Official Charts Specialist Number One Awards	2024	Official Singles Downloads Chart	"Yes, And?"	Won	
The Official Charts Specialist Number One Awards	2024	Official Physical Singles Chart	"Yes, And?"	Won	
The Official Charts Specialist Number One Awards	2024	Official Physical Singles Chart	"We Can't Be Friends (Wait for Your Love)"	Won	
The Official Charts Specialist Number One Awards	2024	Official Vinyl Singles Chart	"Yes, And?"	Won	
The Official Charts Specialist Number One Awards	2024	Official Vinyl Singles Chart	"We Can't Be Friends (Wait for Your Love)"	Won	
The Official Charts Specialist Number One Awards	2024	Official Albums Streaming Chart	Eternal Sunshine	Won	
The Official Charts Specialist Number One Awards	2024	Official Vinyl Albums Chart	Eternal Sunshine	Won	
The Official Charts Specialist Number One Awards	2025	Official Physical Singles Chart	"Dandelion"	Won	
The Official Charts Specialist Number One Awards	2025	Official Vinyl Singles Chart	"Dandelion"	Won	
The Official Charts Specialist Number One Awards	2026	Official Physical Singles Chart	"34+35"	Won	
The Official Charts Specialist Number One Awards	2026	Official Vinyl Singles Chart	"34+35"	Won	
The Official Charts Specialist Number One Awards	2026	Official Singles Sales Chart	"Hate That I Made You Love Me"	Won	
The Official Charts Specialist Number One Awards	2026	Official Singles Downloads Chart	"Hate That I Made You Love Me"	Won	
The Official Charts Specialist Number One Awards	2026	Official Physical Singles Chart	"Hate That I Made You Love Me"	Won	
The Official Charts Specialist Number One Awards	2026	Official Vinyl Singles Chart	"Hate That I Made You Love Me"	Won	
The Official Charts Specialist Number One Awards	2026	Official Albums Streaming Chart	Petal	Won	
The Official Charts Specialist Number One Awards	2026	Number One Albums Sales	Petal	Won	
The Official Charts Specialist Number One Awards	2026	Number One Album Downloads	Petal	Won	
The Official Charts Specialist Number One Awards	2026	Number One Physical Albums	Petal	Won	
The Official Charts Specialist Number One Awards	2026	Number One Vinyl Albums	Petal	Won	
The Official Charts Specialist Number One Awards	2026	Number One Scottish Albums	Petal	Won	
Online Film Critics Society	2025	Wicked	Best Supporting Actress	Nominated	
Palm Springs International Film Festival	2025	Rising Star Award	Wicked	Won	
Paris Film Critics Association Awards	2026	Best Supporting Actress	Wicked: For Good	Nominated	
People's Choice Awards	2014	Favorite Breakout Artist	Herself	Won	
People's Choice Awards	2015	Favorite Album	My Everything	Nominated	
People's Choice Awards	2015	Favorite Song	"Bang Bang" (with Jessie J and Nicki Minaj)	Nominated	
People's Choice Awards	2017	Favorite Female Artist	Herself	Nominated	
People's Choice Awards	2017	Favorite Pop Artist	Herself	Nominated	
People's Choice Awards	2017	Favorite Album	Dangerous Woman	Nominated	
People's Choice Awards	2018	Female Artist of the Year	Herself	Nominated	
People's Choice Awards	2018	Album of the Year	Sweetener	Nominated	
People's Choice Awards	2018	Song of the Year	"No Tears Left to Cry"	Nominated	
People's Choice Awards	2018	Music Video of the Year	"No Tears Left to Cry"	Nominated	
People's Choice Awards	2019	Music Video of the Year	"7 Rings"	Nominated	
People's Choice Awards	2019	Song of the Year	"7 Rings"	Nominated	
People's Choice Awards	2019	Female Artist of the Year	Herself	Nominated	
People's Choice Awards	2019	Album of the Year	Thank U, Next	Nominated	
People's Choice Awards	2019	Concert Tour of the Year	Sweetener World Tour	Nominated	
People's Choice Awards	2019	Social Celebrity of the Year	Herself	Nominated	
People's Choice Awards	2020	Social Celebrity of the Year	Herself	Won	
People's Choice Awards	2020	Female Artist of the Year	Herself	Won	
People's Choice Awards	2020	Song of the Year	"Stuck with U" (with Justin Bieber)	Nominated	
People's Choice Awards	2020	Song of the Year	"Rain on Me" (with Lady Gaga)	Nominated	
People's Choice Awards	2020	Collaboration Song of the Year	"Rain on Me" (with Lady Gaga)	Nominated	
People's Choice Awards	2020	Music Video of the Year	"Rain on Me" (with Lady Gaga)	Nominated	
PETA's Libby Awards	2023	Heroes — Favorite Celeb Cruelty-Free Beauty Brand	r.e.m. beauty by Ariana Grande	Nominated	
PETA's Libby Awards	2023	Lifestyle — Favorite Cruelty-Free Beauty Product	r.e.m. beauty by Ariana Grande	Nominated	
PETA's Libby Awards	2024	Heroes — Best Viral Moment for Animals	Herself	Won	
PETA's Libby Awards	2024	Lifestyle — Favorite Vegan and Cruelty-Free Eye Shadow	r.e.m. beauty by Ariana Grande	Nominated	
Phoenix Film Critics Society	2024	Best Supporting Actress	Wicked	Won	
PLAY - Portuguese Music Awards	2019	Best International Artist	Herself	Nominated	
Pollstar Awards	2017	Best Pop Tour	Dangerous Woman Tour	Nominated	
Pollstar Awards	2019	Best Pop Tour	Sweetener World Tour	Nominated	
Q Awards	2019	Best Live Performance	Herself	Nominated	
Queerty Awards	2021	Anthem	"Rain on Me" (with Lady Gaga)	Won	
Radio Disney Music Awards	2014	Chart Topper Award	Herself	Won	
Radio Disney Music Awards	2014	Breakout Artist	Herself	Nominated	
Radio Disney Music Awards	2014	Most Talked About Artist	Herself	Nominated	
Radio Disney Music Awards	2015	Best Female Artist	Herself	Won	
Radio Disney Music Awards	2015	Song of the Year	"Problem" (featuring Iggy Azalea)	Won	
Radio Disney Music Awards	2015	Artist with the Best Style	Herself	Nominated	
Radio Disney Music Awards	2015	Most Talked About Artist	Herself	Won	
Radio Disney Music Awards	2016	Best Song To Dance To	"Focus"	Won	
Radio Disney Music Awards	2017	Best Female Artist	Herself	Won	
Radio Disney Music Awards	2017	Best Collaboration	"Beauty and the Beast" (with John Legend)	Nominated	
RIAA Diamond Awards	2024	Diamond Song Award	"Bang Bang" (with Jessie J and Nicki Minaj)	Won	
RIAA Diamond Awards	2025	Diamond Song Award	"7 Rings"	Won	
Ritmo Latino Entertainment Awards	2025	Favorite International Artist	Herself	Nominated	
Rockbjörnen	2017	Concert of the Year	Herself	Nominated	
Rockbjörnen	2018	Foreign Song of the Year	"No Tears Left to Cry"	Nominated	
Rockbjörnen	2019	Foreign Song of the Year	"7 Rings"	Nominated	
Rockbjörnen	2021	Foreign Song of the Year	"Rain on Me" (with Lady Gaga)	Nominated	
RTHK International Pop Poll Awards	2018	Super Gold Song	"Beauty and the Beast" (with John Legend)	Won	
RTHK International Pop Poll Awards	2018	Top Ten International Gold Songs	"Beauty and the Beast" (with John Legend)	Won	
RTHK International Pop Poll Awards	2019	Top Ten International Gold Songs	"7 Rings"	Won	
RTHK International Pop Poll Awards	2019	Top Ten International Gold Songs	"Thank U, Next"	Won	
RTHK International Pop Poll Awards	2019	The Best Selling English Album	Thank U, Next	Won	
RTHK International Pop Poll Awards	2019	Top Female Artist	Herself	Silver	
RTHK International Pop Poll Awards	2020	Top Female Artist	Herself	Bronze	
RTHK International Pop Poll Awards	2020	Top Ten International Gold Songs	"Boyfriend" (with Social House)	Won	
RTHK International Pop Poll Awards	2021	Top Ten International Gold Songs	"Rain on Me" (with Lady Gaga)	Won	
RTHK International Pop Poll Awards	2023	Top Ten International Gold Songs	"Die For You (Remix)" (with The Weeknd)	Won	
RTHK International Pop Poll Awards	2024	Top Ten International Gold Songs	"Yes, And?"	Nominated	
RTHK International Pop Poll Awards	2024	Top Ten International Gold Songs	"We Can't Be Friends (Wait for Your Love)"	Nominated	
RTHK International Pop Poll Awards	2024	Top Female Singers	Herself	Nominated	
San Diego Film Critics Society	2022	Best Ensemble	Don't Look Up	Won	
San Diego Film Critics Society	2024	Best Supporting Actress	Wicked	Won	
San Diego Film Critics Society	2024	Best Ensemble	Wicked	Nominated	
Santa Barbara International Film Festival	2025	Virtuoso Award	Wicked	Won	
San Francisco Bay Area Film Critics Circle	2024	Best Supporting Actress	Wicked	Nominated	
Satellite Awards	2019	Best Original Song	"Don't Call Me Angel" (with Miley Cyrus and Lana Del Rey)	Nominated	
Satellite Awards	2025	Best Actress in a Supporting Role	Wicked	Won	
Satellite Awards	2026	Best Actress in a Supporting Role	Wicked: For Good	Nominated	
Saturn Awards	2026	Best Supporting Actress	Wicked: For Good	Nominated	
Seattle Film Critics Society	2024	Best Supporting Actress	Wicked	Nominated	
Seattle Film Critics Society	2025	Best Supporting Actress	Wicked: For Good	Nominated	
SESAC Music Awards	2024	Performance Award	"Yes, And?"	Won	
SESAC Music Awards	2024	Performance Award	"We Can't Be Friends (Wait for Your Love)"	Won	
SESAC LA Music Awards	2025	Songwriter of the Year	Herself	Won	
SESAC LA Music Awards	2025	Song of the Year	"We Can't Be Friends (Wait for Your Love)"	Won	
SESAC LA Music Awards	2025	Performance Award	"We Can't Be Friends (Wait for Your Love)"	Won	
SESAC LA Music Awards	2025	Performance Award	"The Boy Is Mine"	Won	
Screen Awards	2025	Best Supporting Performance by an Actress – Film	Wicked: For Good	Nominated	
Shop Today Beauty Awards	2023	Best Liquid Eyeshadow	r.e.m. beauty by Ariana Grande	Won	
Shop Today Beauty Awards	2025	Best Overall Blush	r.e.m. beauty by Ariana Grande	Won	
Shorty Awards	2017	Best in Music	Herself	Nominated	
Shorty Awards	2019	Storyteller of the Year	Herself	Won	
Society of Composers and Lyricists Awards	2022	Outstanding Original Song for a Comedy or Musical Visual Media Production	"Just Look Up" (With Kid Cudi)	Won	
Southeastern Film Critics Association	2024	Best Supporting Actress	Wicked	Won	
Space Shower Music Awards	2017	Best International Artist	Herself	Nominated	
Space Shower Music Awards	2019	Best International Artist	Herself	Won	
Spotify Awards	2020	Most-Streamed Female Artist	Herself	Nominated	
Spotify Awards	2020	Most-Streamed Female Artist – For Users From 13 to 17 Years Old	Herself	Nominated	
Spotify Awards	2020	Most-Streamed Female Artist – For Users From 18 to 29 Years Old	Herself	Nominated	
St. Louis Film Critics Association Awards	2024	Best Supporting Actress	Wicked	Runner-up	
St. Louis Film Critics Association Awards	2024	Best Ensemble	Wicked	Nominated	
Streamy Awards	2017	Cover Song	"Somewhere Over the Rainbow"	Won	
Style Beauty Awards	2023	Best Celebrity Brand	r.e.m. beauty by Ariana Grande	Nominated	
TEC Awards	2022	Outstanding Creative Achievement – Record Production/Single or Track	"Positions"	Nominated	
Teen Choice Awards	2013	Choice Breakout Artist	Herself	Nominated	
Teen Choice Awards	2013	Choice Music: Summer Female Artist	Herself	Nominated	
Teen Choice Awards	2013	Choice Style Icon	Herself	Nominated	
Teen Choice Awards	2013	Choice Love Song	"The Way" (featuring Mac Miller)	Nominated	
Teen Choice Awards	2014	Choice Female Artist	Herself	Won	
Teen Choice Awards	2014	Choice Music: Summer Female Artist	Herself	Nominated	
Teen Choice Awards	2014	Choice Hottie: Female	Herself	Nominated	
Teen Choice Awards	2014	Choice Fanatic Fans	Herself	Nominated	
Teen Choice Awards	2014	Choice Music Single: Female Artist	"Problem" (featuring Iggy Azalea)	Won	
Teen Choice Awards	2014	Choice Break-Up Song	"Break Free" (featuring Zedd)	Nominated	
Teen Choice Awards	2014	Choice Web: Collaboration	Herself and Alfie Deyes	Nominated	
Teen Choice Awards	2015	Choice Music: Summer Female Artist	Herself	Nominated	
Teen Choice Awards	2015	Choice Song: Female Artist	"One Last Time"	Won	
Teen Choice Awards	2015	Choice Song: Female Artist	"Bang Bang" (with Jessie J and Nicki Minaj)	Nominated	
Teen Choice Awards	2015	Choice Summer Music Artist: Female	Herself	Nominated	
Teen Choice Awards	2015	Choice Summer Tour	The Honeymoon Tour	Nominated	
Teen Choice Awards	2015	Choice Instagrammer	Herself	Won	
Teen Choice Awards	2016	Choice Music: Female Artist	Herself	Nominated	
Teen Choice Awards	2016	Choice Summer Music Star: Female	Herself	Nominated	
Teen Choice Awards	2016	Choice Song: Female Artist	"Dangerous Woman"	Won	
Teen Choice Awards	2016	Choice Love Song	"Into You"	Nominated	
Teen Choice Awards	2016	Choice Selfie Taker	Herself	Won	
Teen Choice Awards	2017	Choice Female Artist	Herself	Won	
Teen Choice Awards	2017	Choice Summer Tour	Dangerous Woman Tour	Won	
Teen Choice Awards	2017	Choice Snapchatter	Herself	Won	
Teen Choice Awards	2017	Choice Change Maker	Herself	Won	
Teen Choice Awards	2017	Choice Fandom	Herself	Nominated	
Teen Choice Awards	2018	Choice Female Artist	Herself	Nominated	
Teen Choice Awards	2018	Choice Summer: Female Artist	Herself	Nominated	
Teen Choice Awards	2018	Choice Snapchatter	Herself	Won	
Teen Choice Awards	2018	Choice Song: Female Artist	"No Tears Left to Cry"	Nominated	
Teen Choice Awards	2018	Choice Pop Song	"No Tears Left to Cry"	Nominated	
Teen Choice Awards	2019	Choice Pop Song	"Thank U, Next"	Won	
Teen Choice Awards	2019	Choice Song: Female Artist	"7 Rings"	Nominated	
Teen Choice Awards	2019	Choice Female Artist	Herself	Nominated	
Teen Choice Awards	2019	Choice Summer Tour	Sweetener World Tour	Nominated	
Teen Choice Awards	2019	Choice Fandom	Herself	Nominated	
Telehit Awards	2015	Most Popular Video in Telehit	"Break Free" (featuring Zedd)	Nominated	
Telehit Awards	2015	Female Soloist of the Year	Herself	Nominated	
Telehit Awards	2016	Female Soloist of the Year	Herself	Nominated	
Telehit Awards	2016	Video English Network Order	"Focus"	Nominated	
Telehit Awards	2017	Female Soloist of the Year	Herself	Nominated	
Telehit Awards	2019	Best Solo Female Act	Herself	Nominated	
Telehit Awards	2019	Best Anglo Video	"7 Rings"	Nominated	
Ticketmaster Awards	2019	Touring Milestone	Sweetener World Tour	Won	
UK Music Video Awards	2025	Best Special Video Project	Brigther Days Ahead	Nominated	
Vevo Hot This Year Awards	2014	"Bang Bang" (with Jessie J and Nicki Minaj)	Best Collaboration Video	Won	
The Official Vodafone Big Top 40 Number One Awards (Note: The Official Vodafone Big Top 40 Number One Awards were introduced in 2009 and are given to artists who top the Big Top 40 chart.)	2014	Number One Award	"Problem"	Won	
The Official Vodafone Big Top 40 Number One Awards	2014	Number One Award	"Bang Bang" (with Jessie J and Nicki Minaj)	Won	
The Official Vodafone Big Top 40 Number One Awards	2018	Number One Award	"No Tears Left to Cry"	Won	
The Official Vodafone Big Top 40 Number One Awards	2018	Number One Award	"Thank U, Next"	Won	
The Official Vodafone Big Top 40 Number One Awards	2020	Number One Award	"Stuck with U" (with Justin Bieber)	Won	
The Official Vodafone Big Top 40 Number One Awards	2020	Number One Award	"Rain on Me" (with Lady Gaga)	Won	
The Official Vodafone Big Top 40 Number One Awards	2024	Number One Award	"Yes, And?"	Won	
The Official Vodafone Big Top 40 Number One Awards	2024	Number One Award	"Defying Gravity" (with Cynthia Erivo)	Won	
The Official Vodafone Big Top 40 Number One Awards	2026	Number One Award	"Hate That I Made You Love Me"	Won	
Vogue British Beauty Awards	2023	The New Kid On The Block	r.e.m. beauty by Ariana Grande	Won	
Washington D.C. Area Film Critics Association	2024	Best Supporting Actress	Wicked	Nominated	
Washington D.C. Area Film Critics Association	2024	Best Acting Ensemble	Wicked	Nominated	
Washington D.C. Area Film Critics Association	2025	Best Supporting Actress	Wicked: For Good	Nominated	
Webby Awards	2022	Best Fashion & Beauty	r.e.m. beauty by Ariana Grande	Won	
Webby Awards	2022	Best Mobile User Interface	r.e.m. beauty by Ariana Grande	Won	
Webby Awards	2022	Best Mobile Visual Design - Aesthetic	r.e.m. beauty by Ariana Grande	Won	
Webby Awards	2025	Variety & Reality, General Video & Film (Video & Film)	Wicked’ Stars Ariana Grande & Cynthia Erivo Break Down Viral 'Holding Space' Interview	Won	
Weibo Music Awards	2024	Artist of the Year	Herself	Nominated	
Weibo Music Awards	2024	Song of the Year	"Yes, And?"	Nominated	
World Music Awards	2014	World's Best Entertainer of the Year	Herself	Nominated	
World Music Awards	2014	World's Best Female Artist	Herself	Nominated	
World Music Awards	2014	World's Best Live Act	Herself	Nominated	
World Music Awards	2014	World's Best Song	"The Way" (featuring Mac Miller)	Nominated	
World Music Awards	2014	World's Best Video	"The Way" (featuring Mac Miller)	Nominated	
World Music Awards	2014	World's Best Song	"Popular Song"(Mika featuring Ariana Grande)	Nominated	
World Music Awards	2014	World's Best Video	"Popular Song"(Mika featuring Ariana Grande)	Nominated	
World Soundtrack Awards	2022	Best Original Song	"Just Look Up" (With Kid Cudi)	Nominated	
WOWIE Awards	2018	Tag Your Bestie	"Thank U, Next"	Won	
WOWIE Awards	2020	Outstanding Musical Performance	Lady Gaga & Ariana Grande at the 2020 MTV Video Music Awards	Nominated	
WOWIE Awards	2022	Biggest Drag Superfan	Herself	Won	
WOWIE Awards	2023	Best Ally	Herself	Won	
Young Hollywood Awards	2014	Hottest Music Artist	Herself	Nominated	
Young Hollywood Awards	2014	Song of the Summer/DJ Replay	"Problem" (featuring Iggy Azalea)	Nominated	
Young Hollywood Awards	2014	Best Social Media Superstar	Herself	Nominated	
Young Hollywood Awards	2014	Coolest Cross Over Artist	Herself	Nominated	
YouTube Creator Awards	2011	Silver Play Button - 100k subscribers	Herself	Silver	
YouTube Creator Awards	2013	Gold Play Button - 1M subscribers	Herself	Gold	
YouTube Creator Awards	2015	Diamond Play Button - 10M subscribers	Herself	Diamond	
YouTube Creator Awards	2015	Silver Play Button - 100k subscribers	"Honeymoon Diaries"	Silver	
YouTube Creator Awards	2021	Custom Play Button - 50M subscribers	Herself	Custom Award	
YouTube Creator Awards	2022	Silver Play Button - 100k subscribers	r.e.m. beauty by Ariana Grande	Silver	
YouTube Music Awards	2015	50 Artists to Watch	Herself	Won	

== Other accolades ==
=== World records ===
Name of publication, year the record was awarded, name of the record, and the name of the record holder
Publication	Year	World record	Record holder	R. status	Ref.
Guinness World Records	2018	Fastest time for a music track to reach 100 million streams on Spotify	"Thank U, Next"	Eliminated	
Guinness World Records	2018	Most streamed track on Spotify in one week (female)	"Thank U, Next"	Eliminated	
Guinness World Records	2018	Most viewed music video online in 24 hours	"Thank U, Next"	Eliminated	
Guinness World Records	2018	Most views of a new music video release from a solo artist in 24 hours on YouTube	"Thank U, Next"	Eliminated	
Guinness World Records	2018	Most simultaneous viewers for a music video on YouTube Premieres	"Thank U, Next"	Eliminated	
Guinness World Records	2018	Most streamed track in one week by a female artist on the Billboard charts	"Thank U, Next"	Record	
Guinness World Records	2018	Most streams on Spotify in one year for a female musician	Herself	Eliminated	
Guinness World Records	2018	Most monthly listeners on Spotify for a female	Herself	Eliminated	
Guinness World Records	2019	Most followers on Instagram for a female	Herself	Eliminated	
Guinness World Records	2019	Most subscribers for a musician on YouTube (female)	Herself	Eliminated	
Guinness World Records	2019	Most streamed track on Spotify in one week (female)	"7 Rings"	Eliminated	
Guinness World Records	2019	Most streamed track on Spotify in one week	"7 Rings"	Eliminated	
Guinness World Records	2019	Most streamed pop album in one week (USA)	Thank U, Next	Record	
Guinness World Records	2019	Most streamed album by a female artist in the first 24 hours on Spotify	Thank U, Next	Eliminated	
Guinness World Records	2019	Most on-demand audio streams for a female album in the first 24 hours (USA)	Thank U, Next	Eliminated	
Guinness World Records	2019	Most streamed album by a female artist in one week (USA)	Thank U, Next	Eliminated	
Guinness World Records	2019	Most streamed album by a female artist in one week (UK)	Thank U, Next	Record	
Guinness World Records	2019	First solo act to occupy top three positions simultaneously on US singles chart	Herself	Record	
Guinness World Records	2020	Most followers on Instagram for a female	Herself	Eliminated	
Guinness World Records	2020	Most subscribers for a musician on YouTube (female)	Herself	Eliminated	
Guinness World Records	2020	Most followers on Spotify (female)	Herself	Eliminated	
Guinness World Records	2020	Fastest hat-trick of UK No.1 singles by a female artist	Herself	Record	
Guinness World Records	2020	Most simultaneous Top 40 entries on US singles chart by a female artist	Herself	Record	
Guinness World Records	2020	First female artist to replace herself at No.1 on UK singles chart	Herself	Record	
Guinness World Records	2020	First solo artist to replace themselves at No.1 on UK singles chart for two consecutive weeks	Herself	Record	
Guinness World Records	2020	Most popular Eevee tattoo	Herself	Record	
Guinness World Records	2020	Most MTV VMA nominations for Best Collaboration	Herself	Record	
Guinness World Records	2020	Most monthly listeners on Spotify for a female	Herself	Eliminated	
Guinness World Records	2020	Most streamed act on Spotify (female)	Herself	Eliminated	
Guinness World Records	2020	Most songs to debut at number one on the Billboard Hot 100	Herself	Eliminated	
Guinness World Records	2020	Highest annual earnings for a female musician (current year)	Herself	Record	
Guinness World Records	2021	Most followers on Instagram for a female	Herself	Eliminated	
Guinness World Records	2021	Most followers on Instagram for a musician	Herself	Record	
Guinness World Records	2021	Most followers on Instagram for a female musician	Herself	Eliminated	
Guinness World Records	2021	Most monthly listeners on Spotify for a female	Herself	Eliminated	
Guinness World Records	2022	Most Nickelodeon Kids’ Choice Awards blimps won for Favorite Female Artist	Herself	Record	
Guinness World Records	2022	Most songs to debut at No.1 on the Billboard Hot 100 (female)	Herself	Eliminated	
Guinness World Records	2024	Most songs to debut at No.1 on the Billboard Hot 100 (female)	Herself	Record	
Guinness World Records	2025	Most monthly listeners on Spotify for a female	Herself	Eliminated	
Guinness World Records	2025	Most Artist of the Year nominations at the MTV Video Music Awards	Herself	Record	
Guinness World Records	2026	Most monthly listeners on Spotify for a female	Herself	Record	

=== Streaming milestones ===
Name of the achievement, year presented, category, work(s), and the result
Achievement	Year	Category	Work(s)	Result	Ref.
Pandora's "Billionaires" Milestone Program Plaques	2021	Pop Billionaires	Herself	Won	
Spotify Plaques	2020	1,000,000,000 Streams	"7 Rings"	Won	
Spotify Plaques	2020	1,000,000,000 Streams	"Thank U, Next"	Won	
Spotify Plaques	2021	1,000,000,000 Streams	"Side to Side" (featuring Nicki Minaj)	Won	
Spotify Plaques	2021	1,000,000,000 Streams	"No Tears Left to Cry"	Won	
Spotify Plaques	2022	1,000,000,000 Streams	"Bang Bang" (with Jessie J and Nicki Minaj)	Won	
Spotify Plaques	2022	1,000,000,000 Streams	"Into You"	Won	
Spotify Plaques	2022	1,000,000,000 Streams	"Positions"	Won	
Spotify Plaques	2022	1,000,000,000 Streams	"One Last Time"	Won	
Spotify Plaques	2023	1,000,000,000 Streams	"Save Your Tears (Remix)" (with The Weeknd)	Won	
Spotify Plaques	2023	1,000,000,000 Streams	"Stuck with U" (with Justin Bieber)	Won	
Spotify Plaques	2023	1,000,000,000 Streams	"God Is a Woman"	Won	
Spotify Plaques	2023	1,000,000,000 Streams	"Rain on Me" (with Lady Gaga)	Won	
Spotify Plaques	2023	1,000,000,000 Streams	"Santa Tell Me"	Won	
Spotify Plaques	2024	1,000,000,000 Streams	"Dangerous Woman"	Won	
Spotify Plaques	2024	1,000,000,000 Streams	"34+35"	Won	
Spotify Plaques	2024	1,000,000,000 Streams	"Break Up with Your Girlfriend, I'm Bored"	Won	
Spotify Plaques	2024	1,000,000,000 Streams	"Die For You (Remix)" (with The Weeknd)	Won	
Spotify Plaques	2024	1,000,000,000 Streams	"We Can't Be Friends (Wait for Your Love)"	Won	
Spotify Plaques	2024	1,000,000,000 Streams	"Love Me Harder" (with The Weeknd)	Won	
Spotify Plaques	2025	1,000,000,000 Streams	"Break Free" (with Zedd)	Won	
Spotify Plaques	2025	1,000,000,000 Streams	"Problem" (featuring Iggy Azalea)	Won	
Spotify Plaques	2025	1,000,000,000 Streams	"Boyfriend" (featuring Social House)	Won	

=== Listicles ===
Name of publisher, name of listicle, year(s) listed, and placement result
Publisher	Listicle	Year(s)	Result	Ref.
BBC	Best Pop and Hip-hop Collaborations	—	Placed ("Side to Side")	
Billboard	The Greatest Pop Star By Year (1981–2025)	2019	1st	
Billboard	The Greatest Pop Star By Year (1981–2025)	2024	6th	
Billboard	The Greatest Pop Star By Year (1981–2025)	2015, 2018, 2021, 2025	Honorable Mention	
Billboard	Money Makers	2015	29th	
Billboard	Money Makers	2018	42nd	
Billboard	Money Makers	2020	2nd	
Billboard	The 100 Greatest Music Video Artists of All Time	2020	63rd	
Billboard	The 100 Greatest Albums of the 2010s	2019	8th (Thank U, Next)	
Billboard	The 100 Greatest Albums of the 2010s	2019	38th (Sweetener)	
Billboard	Songs That Defined the Decade	2019	Placed ("Thank U, Next")	
Billboard	Greatest of All Time Hot 100 Artists	2019	78th	
Billboard	The 100 Moments That Defined the Decade in Music	2020	Placed (One Love Manchester)	
Billboard	The 100 Moments That Defined the Decade in Music	2020	Placed ("Thank U, Next")	
Billboard	Billboard Music Awards: Best Moments of All Time	2020	Placed ("Problem" live performance at the 2014 Billboard Music Awards)	
Billboard	Billboard Music Awards: Best Moments of All Time	2020	Placed ("No Tears Left to Cry" live performance at the 2018 Billboard Music Awards)	
Billboard	Greatest of All Time Holiday 100 Songs	2021	21st ("Santa Tell Me")	
Billboard	The 100 Best Christmas Songs of All Time	2021	13th ("Santa Tell Me")	
Billboard	The 100 Greatest Song Bridges of the 21st Century	2021	62nd ("Break Up with Your Girlfriend, I'm Bored")	
Billboard	The 50 Best Song Interpolations of the 21st Century	2021	Placed ("Break Up with Your Girlfriend, I'm Bored")	
Billboard	The 50 Best Song Interpolations of the 21st Century	2021	Placed ("7 Rings")	
Billboard	Top 20 Thank You Songs About Being Grateful	2022	1st ("Thank U, Next")	
Billboard	The 50 Greatest Album Covers of All Time	2022	38th (Sweetener)	
Billboard	The 500 Best Pop Songs	2023	66th ("Thank U, Next")	
Billboard	Greatest Pop Stars of the 21st Century	2024	9th	
Billboard	Top 200 Albums of the 21st Century	2024	144th (Thank U, Next)	
Billboard	Best Christmas Songs of the 21st Century	2024	2nd ("Santa Tell Me")	
Billboard	Top Women Artists of the 21st Century	2025	8th	
Billboard	Top 50 Breakup Songs of All Time	2025	54th ("Thank U, Next")	
Billboard	Greatest of All Time Songs of the Summer	2025	155th ("Problem")	
Billboard	Every VMA Winner for Video of the Year, Ranked	2025	26th	
Billboard	The Top Songwriters of the 21st Century	2025	12th	
Billboard	The 100 Most Iconic Pop Star Memes of All Time	2025	10th ("Holding Space") (with Cynthia Erivo)	
Billboard	The 100 Most Iconic Pop Star Memes of All Time	2025	69th ("And What About It?")	
Billboard	The 100 Most Iconic Pop Star Memes of All Time	2025	77th ("One taught me...")	
Brandwatch	Most Influential People on Twitter	2016	12th	
Brandwatch	Most Influential People on Twitter	2019	9th	
Brandwatch	Most Influential People on Twitter	2020-2021	7th	
Business Insider	The 113 Best Songs of the Past Decade	2019	18th ("Thank U, Next")	
Business Insider	The 113 Best Songs of the Past Decade	2019	60th ("Into You")	
Business Insider	The 113 Best Songs of the Past Decade	2019	80th ("God Is a Woman")	
Bustle	Best Christmas Songs	2021	Placed ("Santa Tell Me")	
Chicago Tribune	The Top 25 Pride Anthems of All Time	2020	14th ("Break Free")	
Consequence	The 100 Top Albums of the 2010s	2019	97th (Thank U, Next)	
Consequence	The 100 Top Songs of the 2010s	2019	64th ("Thank U, Next")	
Consequence	The 25 Top Pop Songs of the 2010s	2019	17th ("Thank U, Next")	
Consequence	The 100 Best Vocalists of All Time	2026	Placed	
CR Fashion Book	The Greatest Coachella Performances of all time	2025	6th (Coachella 2019)	
Entertainment Weekly	Entertainer of the Year	2025	Placed	
Forbes	30 Under 30	2013	Placed	
Forbes	World's Highest-Paid Women in Music	2019	Placed	
Forbes	Celebrity 100	2019	Placed	
Forbes	Celebrity 100	2020	Placed	
Genius	The Genius Community's 100 Best Albums of the 2010s	2019	95th (Dangerous Woman)	
Glamour	104 Women Who Defined the Decade in Pop Culture	2019	Placed	
Glamour	Best Met Gala Looks	2025	Placed (Grande, Met Gala 2018)	
Glamour UK	The 51 Best Breakup Songs	2025	8th ("Thank U, Next")	
Glamour UK	The 51 Best Breakup Songs	2025	48th ("We Can't Be Friends (Wait for Your Love)")	
Good Housekeeping	The 58 Greatest Pride Songs and LGBTQ+ Anthems	2025	12th ("Rain on Me")	
The Hollywood Reporter	The Hollywood Reporter's 40 Biggest Celebrity Entrepreneurs in 2022	2022	Placed	
The Hollywood Reporter	Women in Entertainment Power 100	2025	Placed	
Insider	The 20 Top Artists of the Decade	2019	Placed	
Insider	The 200 Best Albums of the 2010s	2019	15th (Thank U, Next)	
InStyle	Best Grammys Looks	2025	5th (Grande, 62nd Annual Grammy Awards)	
Maxim	Maxim Hot 100 (under "Icons & Megastars")	2023	Placed	
NME	10 Artists Who Defined the Decade	2019	7th	
NME	The Best Songs of the Decade	2019	28th ("No Tears Left to Cry")	
Paste	The 30 Best Pop Albums of the 2010s	2019	28th (Sweetener)	
People	Women Changing the Music Industry Today	2022	Placed	
People	Best Christmas Songs	2023	Placed ("Santa Tell Me")	
People	Most Intriguing People of the Year	2024	12th	
Pitchfork	The 200 Best Albums of the 2010s	2019	100th (Sweetener)	
Pitchfork	The 200 Best Songs of the 2010s	2019	48th ("Thank U, Next")	
Pitchfork	The 200 Most Important Artists of Pitchfork's First 25 Years (under "The Essentials")	2021	Placed	
Pollstar	The Millennium's Most Popular Women in Touring	2026	15th	
Rolling Stone	The 20 Biggest Songs of the Summer of the 2010s	2014	Placed ("Problem")	
Rolling Stone	The 50 Best Albums of 2019	2019	1st (Thank U, Next)	
Rolling Stone	The 100 Best Songs of the 2010s	2019	7th ("Thank U, Next")	
Rolling Stone	The 100 Best Albums of the 2010s	2019	30th (Thank U, Next)	
Rolling Stone	500 Greatest Songs of All Time	2021	137th ("Thank U, Next")	
Rolling Stone	The 200 Greatest Singers of All Time	2023	43rd	
Rolling Stone	The 50 Most Inspirational LGBTQ Songs of All Time	2023	40th ("Break Free")	
Rolling Stone	The 250 Greatest Albums of the 21st Century So Far	2025	61st (Thank U, Next)	
Rolling Stone	Best Max Martin Songs	2025	6th ("Into You")	
Rolling Stone	Best Max Martin Songs	2025	18th ("Eternal Sunshine")	
Rolling Stone	Best Max Martin Songs	2025	20th ("Bang Bang")	
Rolling Stone	Best Max Martin Songs	2025	40th ("We Can't Be Friends (Wait for Your Love)")	
Rolling Stone	Best Max Martin Songs	2025	44th ("God Is a Woman")	
Rolling Stone	The 250 Greatest Songs of the 21st Century So Far	2025	40th ("Thank U, Next")	
Rolling Stone India	The 50 Albums of the Decade	2019	40th (Sweetener)	
Spotify	Classic Pop Albums of the Streaming Era	2026	Placed (Thank U, Next)	
Spotify	100 Greatest Pop Songs of the Streaming Era	2026	10th ("No Tears Left to Cry")	
Spotify	100 Greatest Pop Songs of the Streaming Era	2026	16th ("We Can't Be Friends (Wait for Your Love)")	
Spotify	100 Greatest Pop Songs of the Streaming Era	2026	48th ("Into You")	
Spotify	100 Greatest Pop Songs of the Streaming Era	2026	53rd ("Thank U, Next")	
Spotify	100 Greatest Pop Songs of the Streaming Era	2026	95th ("Rain on Me")	
Spotify	Song of the Summer	2026	1st ("Hate That I Made You Love Me")	
Stereogum	The 30 Essential Max Martin Songs	2015	7th ("Problem")	
Stereogum	The 30 Essential Max Martin Songs	2015	15th ("Bang Bang")	
Stereogum	The 200 Best Albums of the 2010s	2019	42nd (Sweetener)	
Stereogum	The 200 Best Songs of the 2010s	2019	9th ("No Tears Left to Cry")	
Stereogum	The 200 Best Songs of the 2010s	2019	41st ("Into You")	
Stylist	The 37 Most Iconic Met Gala Outfits and Dresses of All Time	2025	Placed (Grande, Met Gala 2018)	
The Tab	Coachella’s biggest headliners	2024	7th (Coachella 2019)	
Time	Time 100 (under "Artists" with tribute written by Jason Robert Brown)	2016	Placed	
Time	Next Generation Leaders	2018	Placed	
Time	Time 100 (under "Artists" with tribute written by Troye Sivan)	2019	Placed	
Time Out	The 65 Best Christmas Songs of All Time	2022	21st ("Santa Tell Me")	
Uproxx	All the Best Albums of the 2010s	2019	48th (Thank U, Next)	
Uproxx	All the Best Albums of the 2010s	2019	68th (Sweetener)	
Uproxx	All The Best Songs Of The 2010s	2019	5th ("Thank U, Next")	
USA Today	10 Songs That Defined the 2010s in Music	2019	Placed ("Thank U, Next") (2018)	
Variety	Variety500: The 500 Most Important People in Global Media	2017, 2024	Placed	
Variety	Youth Impact (under "Music")	2014	Placed	
Variety	Variety's Young Hollywood Impact (named to "Alumni" in 2017)	2016	Placed	
W	Best Performances	2025	Placed (Wicked)	
TheWrap	Changemakers	2024	Placed (Wicked)	
Yardbarker	The 50 best albums of the 2010s	2019	Placed (Thank U, Next)	
Yardbarker	The best Coachella headliners ever	2024	Placed (Coachella 2019)	
Yardbarker	The 30 Most Iconic Pop Songs of the 2010s	2025	13th ("Thank U, Next")	

=== State honors ===
Name of country, year given, and name of honor
Country	Year	Honor	Ref.
United Kingdom	2017	Honorary citizenship of Manchester	

== See also ==
- Victorious § Awards and nominations
- Sam & Cat § Awards and nominations
