= Radio Disney Music Award for Artist with the Best Style =

Annual US music award

The following is a list of Radio Disney Music Award winners and nominees for Artist with the Best Style (formerly Best Style and Most Stylish Singer).

== Winners and nominees ==
=== 2000s ===
Year	Winner	Nominees	Ref.
2001	Amanda Bynes	Kirsten Storms; Melissa Joan Hart	
2002	Hilary Duff	Amanda Bynes; Melissa Joan Hart	
2003	Hilary Duff (female)	Amanda Bynes; Lindsay Lohan	
2003	Justin Timberlake (male)	Aaron Carter; Lil' Romeo	
2004	Hilary Duff	Amanda Bynes; Lindsay Lohan	
2005	Amanda Bynes	Hilary Duff; Lindsay Lohan	
2006	Miley Cyrus	Vanessa Hudgens; Alyson Michalka; Raven-Symoné	
2007	Amanda Bynes	Ashley Tisdale; Miley Cyrus; Vanessa Hudgens	

=== 2010s ===
Year	Winner	Nominees	Ref.
2013	Unrealized		
2014	Zendaya	Austin Mahone; Becky G	
2015	Becky G	Zendaya; Ariana Grande	
2016	Becky G	Gwen Stefani; Taylor Swift; Zendaya	
2017	Unrealized		
