= Billboard Music Award for Top Social Artist =

Annual American music award

- Country: United States
- Presented by: Billboard
- First award: 2011
- Final award: 2021
- Currently held by: BTS

Highlights
- Most wins: Justin Bieber (6)
- Most nominations: Justin Bieber (8)

The Billboard Music Award for Top Social Artist is one of three fan-voted categories in the award show. It is awarded based on major fan interactions with music including streaming and social engagement, together with the global online voting results.

The award was first won in 2011 by Justin Bieber, who is the most nominated artist in the category with eight nominations, followed by Ariana Grande with seven, BTS with five, while Rihanna and Taylor Swift each have four. Bieber is also the most awarded nominee with six consecutive wins. His winning streak was broken as of the 2017 ceremony by BTS, who were the first K-pop group ever to be nominated for and win a Billboard Music Award. They have won the award for five consecutive years.

== Winners and nominees ==
Winners are listed first and highlighted in bold.

=== 2010s ===
Year	Artist	Ref.
2011	**Justin Bieber**	
2011	Eminem	
2011	Akon	
2011	Lady Gaga	
2011	Rihanna	
2012	**Justin Bieber**	
2012	Shakira	
2012	Rihanna	
2012	Eminem	
2012	Lady Gaga	
2013	**Justin Bieber**	
2013	One Direction	
2013	Katy Perry	
2013	Rihanna	
2013	Taylor Swift	
2014	**Justin Bieber**	
2014	Miley Cyrus	
2014	One Direction	
2014	Rihanna	
2014	Taylor Swift	
2015	**Justin Bieber**	
2015	Miley Cyrus	
2015	Selena Gomez	
2015	Ariana Grande	
2015	Taylor Swift	
2016	**Justin Bieber**	
2016	Selena Gomez	
2016	Ariana Grande	
2016	Demi Lovato	
2016	Taylor Swift	
2017	**BTS**	
2017	Justin Bieber	
2017	Selena Gomez	
2017	Ariana Grande	
2017	Shawn Mendes	
2018	**BTS**	
2018	Justin Bieber	
2018	Ariana Grande	
2018	Demi Lovato	
2018	Shawn Mendes	
2019	**BTS**	
2019	Exo	
2019	Got7	
2019	Ariana Grande	
2019	Louis Tomlinson	

=== 2020s ===
Year	Artist	Ref.
2020	**BTS**	
2020	Billie Eilish	
2020	Exo	
2020	Got7	
2020	Ariana Grande	
2021	**BTS**	
2021	Blackpink	
2021	Ariana Grande	
2021	SB19	
2021	Seventeen	
