= Billboard Music Award for Top Song Sales Artist =

Annual American music award

- Country: United States
- Presented by: Billboard
- First award: 2016
- Final award: 2024
- Currently held by: Shaboozey

Highlights
- Most wins: Drake, BTS (2 each)
- Most nominations: Drake, Post Malone, The Weeknd (3 each)

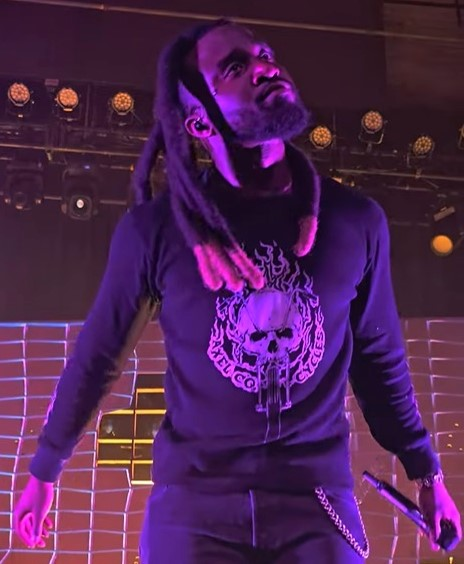
Shaboozey in concert

The Billboard Music Award for Top Songs Sales Artist was first presented at the 2016 Billboard Music Awards. The Weeknd was the award's inaugural recipient. Drake and BTS are the most-awarded artists in the category, both having won twice: the former in 2017 and 2019, and the latter in 2021 and 2022. Drake, Post Malone, and The Weeknd are the most-nominated artists in the category, each having earned three nominations apiece since 2016. BTS became the first group and Korean artist in BBMA history to win the award, at the 2021 ceremony.

== Winners and nominees ==
Winners are listed first and highlighted in bold.

=== 2010s ===
Year	Artist	Ref.
2016	**The Weeknd**	
2016	Adele	
2016	Justin Bieber	
2016	Drake	
2016	Fetty Wap	
2017	**Drake**	
2017	The Chainsmokers	
2017	Prince	
2017	Justin Timberlake	
2017	Twenty One Pilots	
2017	The Weeknd	
2018	**Ed Sheeran**	
2018	Imagine Dragons	
2018	Kendrick Lamar	
2018	Bruno Mars	
2018	Post Malone	
2019	**Drake**	
2019	Ariana Grande	
2019	Imagine Dragons	
2019	Lady Gaga	
2019	Post Malone	

=== 2020s ===
Year	Artist	Ref.
2020	**Lizzo**	
2020	Billie Eilish	
2020	Lil Nas X	
2020	Post Malone	
2020	Taylor Swift	
2021	**BTS**	
2021	Justin Bieber	
2021	Megan Thee Stallion	
2021	Morgan Wallen	
2021	The Weeknd	
2022	**BTS**	
2022	Adele	
2022	Dua Lipa	
2022	Walker Hayes	
2022	Ed Sheeran	
2023	**Taylor Swift**	
2023	Jason Aldean	
2023	Miley Cyrus	
2023	Oliver Anthony Music	
2023	Morgan Wallen	
2024	**Shaboozey**	
2024	Jelly Roll	
2024	Jungkook	
2024	Taylor Swift	
2024	Teddy Swims	
