= 2020 Billboard Music Awards =

Annual American music awards ceremony

- Date: October 14, 2020
- Location: Dolby Theatre; Los Angeles, California
- Hosted by: Kelly Clarkson

Highlights
- Most wins: Post Malone (9)
- Most nominations: Post Malone (16)

Television/radio coverage
- Network: NBC
- Viewership: 3.71 million

The 2020 Billboard Music Awards were held on Wednesday October 14, 2020, at the Dolby Theatre in Los Angeles, California. The ceremony was broadcast live from NBC. Hosted by Kelly Clarkson for the third year in a row, the ceremony was sponsored by TikTok and Xfinity. The ceremony was originally scheduled for April 29, 2020, but was later postponed first indefinitely and then to October due to the COVID-19 pandemic. Nominees were announced on September 22, 2020. Voting opened on TikTok on October 1 and closed on October 13. Presenters were announced October 13.

Post Malone was the most awarded, with nine awards. Malone was also the most nominated, with 16 nominations. Garth Brooks and Killer Mike received the Icon Award and the inaugural Change Maker Award, respectively.

== Background ==
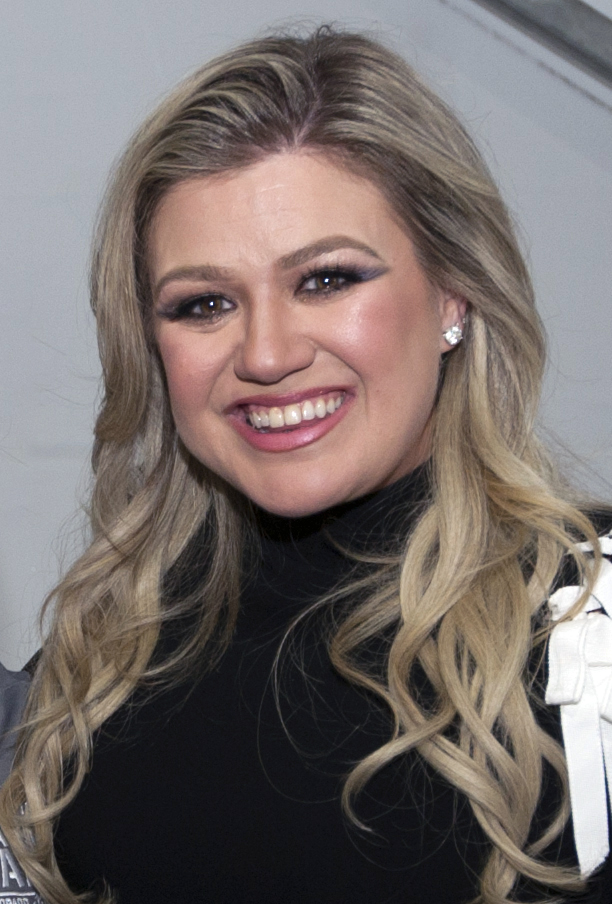
Kelly Clarkson host the show for the third time

The 2020 ceremony was originally scheduled to be held April 29, 2020, at the MGM Grand Garden Arena in Las Vegas. Kelly Clarkson was announced as the host. She had previously hosted the 2018 and 2019 ceremonies. On March 17, NBC and Dick Clark Productions issued a joint statement postponing the ceremony due to the COVID-19 pandemic. In the statement, they stated "[in] accordance with the current guidelines set forth by national and local health officials and in order to ensure the health and safety of our artists, fans, guests and staff, [w]e are postponing the Billboard Music Awards." On August 14 of the same year, the show was rescheduled for October 14. On September 22, the nominees for all categories were announced. The first round of performers were announced September 29. Garth Brooks received the Icon Award, as announced on February 26, 2020; succeeding Mariah Carey, who won the award in 2019. Killer Mike received the inaugural Change Maker Award, as announced two days before the ceremony. Voting for fan-voted categories opened on dance video platform TikTok on October 1. TikTok and Xfinity sponsored the ceremony.

== Performers ==
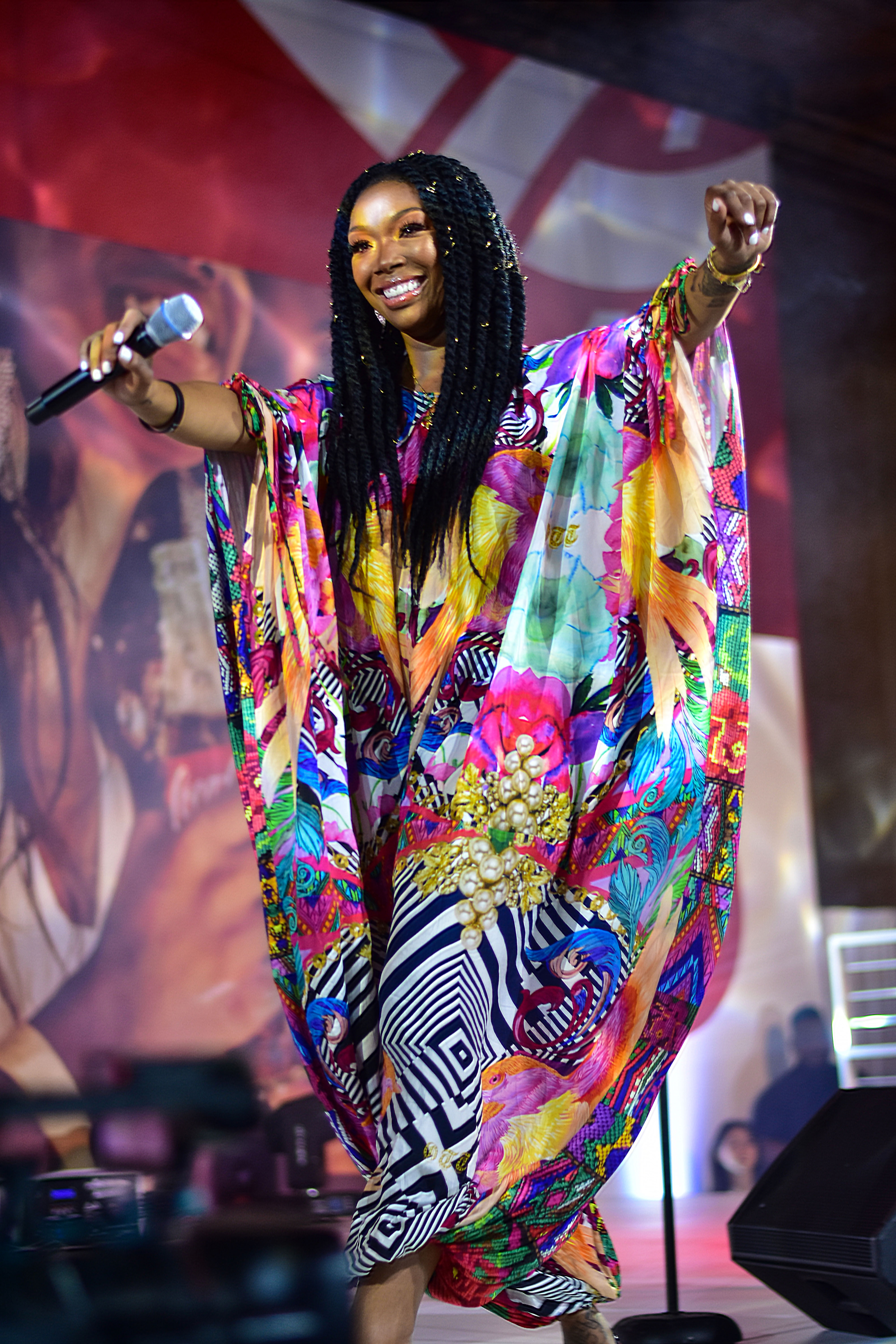
Brandy performed a selection of tracks during the show.

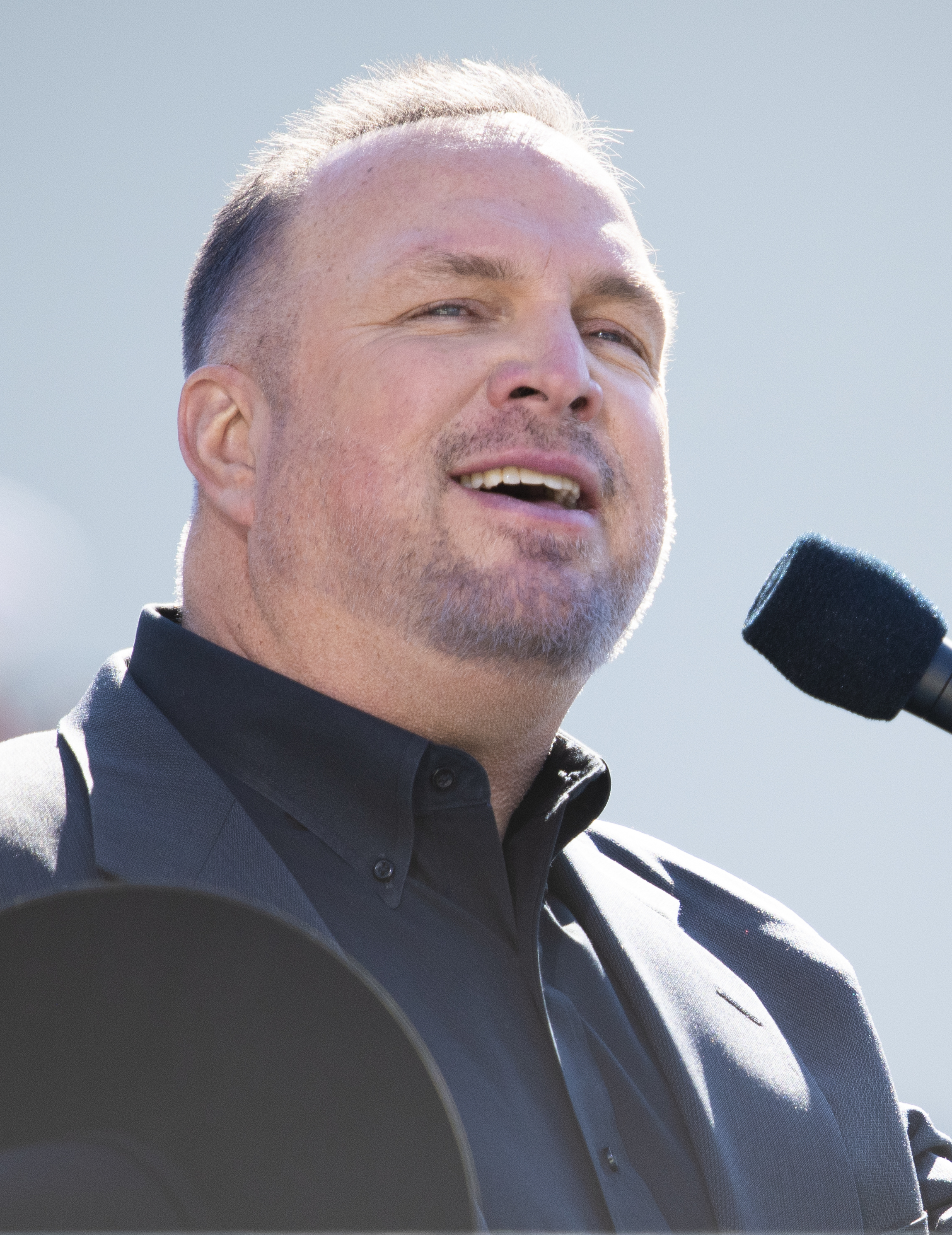
Country music legend Garth Brooks performed a medley of his hits in celebration of receiving the Icon Award.

List of performers and the songs they performed
| Performer(s) | Song(s) |
|---|---|
| Kelly Clarkson, Pentatonix and Sheila E. | "Higher Love" |
| Sia | "Courage to Change" |
| Kane Brown, Swae Lee, Khalid | "Be Like That" |
| Alicia Keys | "Love Looks Better" |
| Luke Combs | "Better Together" |
| Post Malone and Tyla Yaweh | "Circles" "Tommy Lee"^{[a]} |
| Brandy | "Borderline" "Almost Doesn't Count" "No Tomorrow, pt 2." (with Ty Dolla Sign) |
| John Legend | "Never Break" |
| Bad Bunny, Ivy Queen and Nesi | "Yo Perreo Sola" |
| Doja Cat | "Juicy" "Say So" "Like That" |
| Garth Brooks | Icon Award Medley: "The Thunder Rolls" "Callin' Baton Rouge" "The River" "Standing Outside the Fire" "That Summer" "Dive Bar" "Friends in Low Places" "The Dance" |
| Saint Jhn | "Roses" |
| Demi Lovato | "Commander in Chief" |
| BTS | "Dynamite"^{[b]} |
| En Vogue | "Free Your Mind" |

Notes

- ^{^[a]} Pre-taped at the P.W. Gillibrand Co. Silver Sand quarry in Simi Valley, California.
- ^{^[b]} Pre-recorded in Seoul, South Korea.

== Winners and nominees ==
Nominees were announced in a series of Twitter statements on September 22, 2020. Post Malone was the most nominated, with 16 nominations, followed by Lil Nas X with 13, and Khalid and Billie Eilish with 12. Voting for the three fan-voted categories, Billboard Chart Achievement, Top Social Artist and Best Collaboration opened on dance-sharing video app TikTok on October 1, 2020, and closed on October 13.

Winners are listed first and in bold.

| Top Artist | Top New Artist | Billboard Chart Achievement (fan-voted) |
|---|---|---|
| **Post Malone**; Billie Eilish; Jonas Brothers; Khalid; Taylor Swift | **Billie Eilish**; DaBaby; Lil Nas X; Lizzo; Roddy Ricch | **Harry Styles**; Mariah Carey; Luke Combs; Lil Nas X; Taylor Swift |
| Top Male Artist | Top Female Artist | Top Duo/Group |
| **Post Malone**; DaBaby; Khalid; Lil Nas X; Ed Sheeran | **Billie Eilish**; Ariana Grande; Halsey; Lizzo; Taylor Swift | **Jonas Brothers**; BTS; Dan + Shay; Maroon 5; Panic! at the Disco |
| Top Billboard 200 Artist | Top Hot 100 Artist | Top Streaming Songs Artist |
| **Post Malone**; Drake; Billie Eilish; Khalid; Taylor Swift | **Post Malone**; DaBaby; Billie Eilish; Khalid; Lil Nas X | **Post Malone**; DaBaby; Billie Eilish; Lil Nas X; Travis Scott |
| Top Song Sales Artist | Top Radio Songs Artist | Top Social Artist (fan-voted) |
| **Lizzo**; Billie Eilish; Lil Nas X; Post Malone; Taylor Swift | **Jonas Brothers**; Khalid; Lizzo; Shawn Mendes; Post Malone | **BTS**; Billie Eilish; Exo; GOT7; Ariana Grande |
| Top Touring Artist | Top R&B Artist | Top R&B Male Artist |
| **Pink**; Elton John; Metallica; The Rolling Stones; Ed Sheeran | **Khalid**; Chris Brown; Lizzo; Summer Walker; The Weeknd | **Khalid**; Chris Brown; The Weeknd |
| Top R&B Female Artist | Top R&B Tour | Top Rap Artist |
| **Summer Walker**; Beyoncé; Lizzo | **Khalid**; B2K; Janet Jackson | **Post Malone**; DaBaby; Juice Wrld; Lil Nas X; Roddy Ricch |
| Top Rap Male Artist | Top Rap Female Artist | Top Rap Tour |
| **Post Malone**; DaBaby; Lil Nas X | **Cardi B**; City Girls; Megan Thee Stallion | **Post Malone**; Drake; Travis Scott |
| Top Country Artist | Top Country Male Artist | Top Country Female Artist |
| **Luke Combs**; Kane Brown; Dan + Shay; Maren Morris; Thomas Rhett | **Luke Combs**; Kane Brown; Thomas Rhett | **Maren Morris**; Kacey Musgraves; Carrie Underwood |
| Top Country Duo/Group | Top Country Tour | Top Rock Artist |
| **Dan + Shay**; Florida Georgia Line; Old Dominion | **George Strait**; Eric Church; Florida Georgia Line | **Panic! at the Disco**; Imagine Dragons; Tame Impala; Tool; Twenty One Pilots |
| Top Rock Tour | Top Latin Artist | Top Dance/Electronic Artist |
| **Elton John**; Metallica; The Rolling Stones | **Bad Bunny**; Anuel AA; J Balvin; Ozuna; Romeo Santos | **The Chainsmokers**; Avicii; DJ Snake; Illenium; Marshmello |
| Top Christian Artist | Top Gospel Artist | Top Billboard 200 Album |
| **Lauren Daigle**; Elevation Worship; For King & Country; Hillsong United; Kanye West | **Kanye West**; Kirk Franklin; Koryn Hawthorne; Tasha Cobbs Leonard; Sunday Service Choir | **Billie Eilish – When We All Fall Asleep, Where Do We Go?**; Ariana Grande – Thank U, Next; Khalid – Free Spirit; Post Malone – Hollywood's Bleeding; Taylor Swift - Lover |
| Top Soundtrack | Top R&B Album | Top Rap Album |
| **Frozen 2**; Aladdin; Descendants 3; Melanie Martinez – K-12; Mötley Crüe – The Dirt | **Khalid – Free Spirit**; Beyoncé – Homecoming: The Live Album; Justin Bieber – Changes; Chris Brown – Indigo; Summer Walker – Over It | **Post Malone – Hollywood's Bleeding**; DaBaby – Kirk; Juice Wrld – Death Race for Love; Roddy Ricch – Please Excuse Me for Being Antisocial; Young Thug – So Much Fun |
| Top Country Album | Top Rock Album | Top Latin Album |
| **Luke Combs – What You See Is What You Get**; Kane Brown – Experiment; Maren Morris – Girl; Thomas Rhett – Center Point Road; Morgan Wallen – If I Know Me | **Tool – Fear Inoculum**; The Lumineers – III; Slipknot – We Are Not Your Kind; Tame Impala – The Slow Rush; Vampire Weekend – Father of the Bride | **J Balvin & Bad Bunny – Oasis**; Farruko – Gangalee; Maluma – 11:11; Romeo Santos – Utopía; Sech – Sueños |
| Top Dance/Electronic Album | Top Christian Album | Top Gospel Album |
| **Marshmello – Marshmello: Fortnite Extended Set**; Avicii – Tim; The Chainsmokers – World War Joy; Illenium – Ascend; Alan Walker – Different World | **Kanye West – Jesus Is King**; Bethel Music – Victory: Recorded Live; Casting Crowns – Only Jesus; Hillsong United – People; Skillet – Victorious | **Kanye West – Jesus Is King**; Kirk Franklin – Long, Live, Love; Donald Lawrence & The Tri-City Singers – Goshen; William McDowell – The Cry: A Live Worship Experience; Sunday Service Choir – Jesus Is Born |
| Top Hot 100 Song | Top Streaming Song | Top Selling Song |
| **Lil Nas X (featuring Billy Ray Cyrus) – "Old Town Road"**; Lewis Capaldi – "Someone You Loved"; Billie Eilish – "Bad Guy"; Lizzo – "Truth Hurts"; Shawn Mendes & Camila Cabello – "Señorita" | **Lil Nas X (featuring Billy Ray Cyrus) – "Old Town Road"**; Chris Brown (featuring Drake) – "No Guidance"; Billie Eilish – "Bad Guy"; Lil Tecca – "Ransom"; Post Malone & Swae Lee – "Sunflower" | **Lil Nas X (featuring Billy Ray Cyrus) – "Old Town Road"**; Lewis Capaldi – "Someone You Loved"; Billie Eilish – "Bad Guy"; Lizzo – "Truth Hurts"; Blake Shelton – "God's Country" |
| Top Radio Song | Top Collaboration (fan-voted) | Top R&B Song |
| **Jonas Brothers – "Sucker"**; Lewis Capaldi – "Someone You Loved"; Khalid – "Talk"; Lizzo – "Truth Hurts"; Ed Sheeran & Justin Bieber – "I Don't Care" | **Shawn Mendes & Camila Cabello – "Señorita"**; Chris Brown (featuring Drake) – "No Guidance"; Lil Nas X (featuring Billy Ray Cyrus) – "Old Town Road"; Post Malone & Swae Lee – "Sunflower"; Ed Sheeran & Justin Bieber – "I Don't Care" | **Khalid – "Talk"**; Chris Brown (featuring Drake) – "No Guidance"; Doja Cat & Tyga – "Juicy"; Lizzo – "Good as Hell"; The Weeknd – "Heartless" |
| Top Rap Song | Top Country Song | Top Rock Song |
| **Lil Nas X (featuring Billy Ray Cyrus) – "Old Town Road"**; Lil Tecca – "Ransom"; Lizzo – "Truth Hurts"; Post Malone & Swae Lee – "Sunflower"; Post Malone – "Wow" | **Dan + Shay with Justin Bieber – "10,000 Hours"**; Maren Morris – "The Bones"; Old Dominion – "One Man Band"; Blake Shelton – "God's Country"; Morgan Wallen – "Whiskey Glasses" | **Panic! at the Disco – "Hey Look Ma, I Made It"**; Imagine Dragons – "Bad Liar"; Machine Gun Kelly x Yungblud x Travis Barker – "I Think I'm Okay"; Twenty One Pilots – "Chlorine"; Twenty One Pilots – "The Hype" |
| Top Latin Song | Top Dance/Electronic Song | Top Christian Song |
| **Daddy Yankee (featuring Snow) – "Con Calma"**; Anuel AA, Daddy Yankee, Karol G, Ozuna & J Balvin – "China"; Bad Bunny & Tainy – "Callaíta"; Jhay Cortez, J Balvin, & Bad Bunny – "No Me Conoce"; Sech (featuring Darell, Nicky Jam, Ozuna, Anuel AA) – "Otro Trago" | **Ellie Goulding x Diplo (featuring Swae Lee) "Close to Me"**; Black Eyed Peas x J Balvin - "Ritmo (Bad Boys for Life)"; Illenium & Jon Bellion – "Good Things Fall Apart"; Kygo x Whitney Houston – "Higher Love"; Marshmello (featuring Chvrches) – "Here with Me" | **For King & Country – "God Only Knows"**; Bethel Music, Jonathan David & Melissa Helser – "Raise a Hallelujah"; Casting Crowns (featuring Matthew West) – "Nobody"; Lauren Daigle – "Rescue"; Kanye West – "Follow God" |
| Top Gospel Song | Icon Award | Change Maker Award |
| **Kanye West – "Follow God"**; Kirk Franklin – "Love Theory"; Kanye West – "Closed on Sunday"; Kanye West – "On God"; Kanye West — "Selah" | **Garth Brooks** | **Killer Mike** |

== Presenters ==
Presenters were announced October 13 in a series of Twitter statements.

- Nicole Richie - presented Top Billboard 200 Album
- Julia Michaels - presented Top Hot 100 Song
- Jharrel Jerome - presented Top Female Artist
- Jane Lynch - presented Top Country Artist
- Sheila E. - presented Top Song Sales Artist
- Keisha Bottoms – presented Change Maker Award
- Twitch - presented Top Latin Artist
- Lilly Singh - presented Top Male Artist
- Cher – presented the Icon Award
- Jay Ellis - presented Top R&B Artist
- Addison Rae - presented Billboard Chart Achievement
- Spencer X - presented Top Social Artist
- Garcelle Beauvais - presented Top Christian Artist
- Taraji P. Henson - presented Top Artist
