= Billboard Music Award for Chart Achievement =

Annual American music award

Billboard Music Awards for Chart Achievement
- Country: United States
- Presented by: Billboard
- First award: 2015
- Currently held by: Harry Styles (2020)

Highlights
- Most nominations: Drake (3)
- Website: billboardmusicawards.com

The Billboard Music Award for Chart Achievement winners. This is one of three fan voted categories in the award show. Drake is the most nominations artist, he has been nominated 3 times (2016, 2018 and 2019). Taylor Swift (2015, 2020) and The Weeknd (2016, 2017) received two nominations.

== Winners and nominees ==
Year	Winner(s)	Nominee(s)	Ref.
2015	Taylor Swift	Iggy Azalea; Meghan Trainor	
2016	Rihanna	Adele; Drake; The Weeknd; Little Big Town	
2017	Twenty One Pilots	Luke Bryan; The Chainsmokers; Nicki Minaj; The Weeknd	
2018	Camila Cabello	Cardi B; Drake; Sam Hunt; Ed Sheeran	
2019	Ariana Grande	Dan + Shay; Drake; Lady Gaga & Bradley Cooper; Dua Lipa	
2020	Harry Styles	Mariah Carey; Luke Combs; Lil Nas X; Taylor Swift	
