= MercyMe discography =

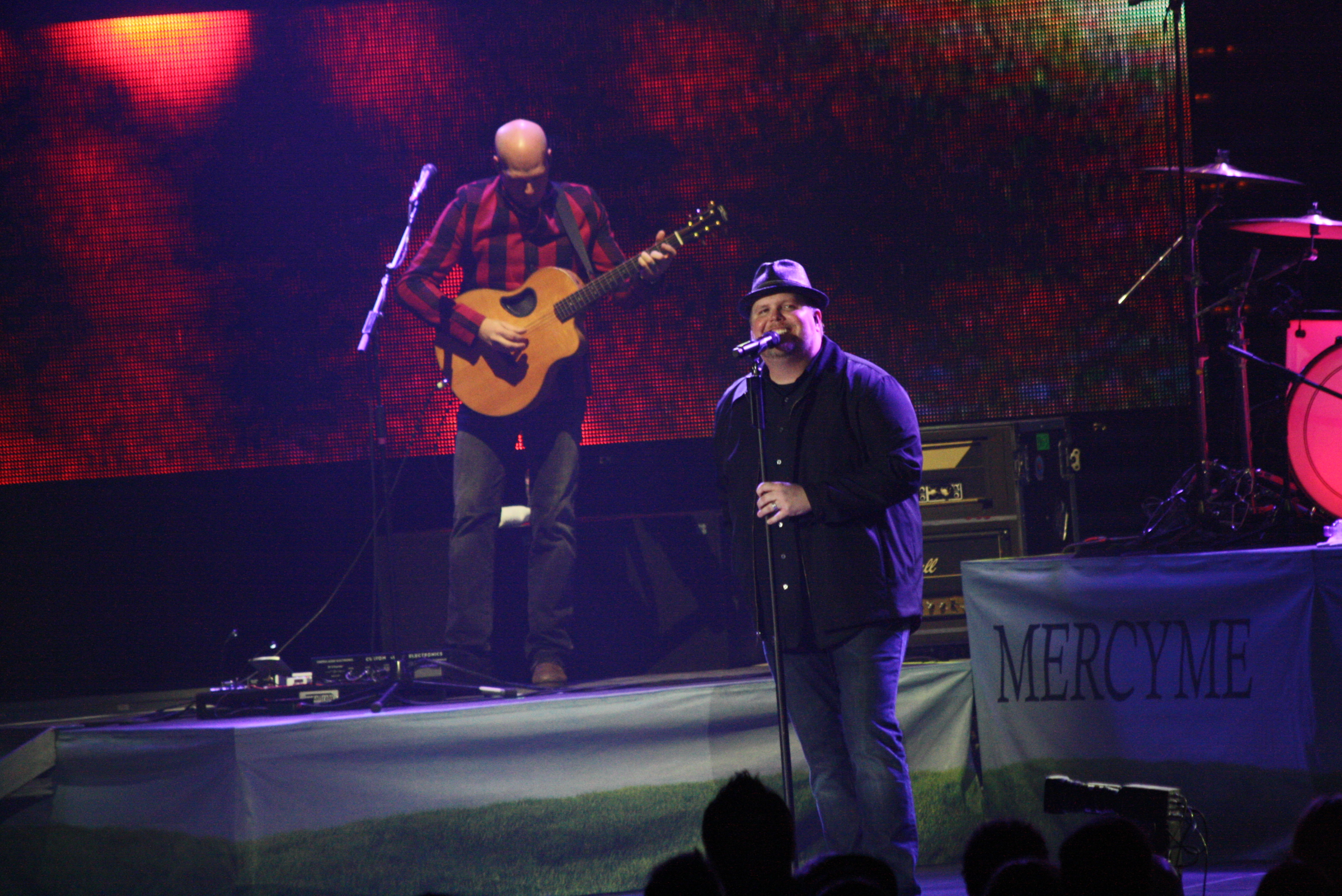
- Lead singer Bart Millard and guitarist Barry Graul at the Rock and Worship Road Show 2011
- Studio albums: 12
- Compilation albums: 3
- Singles: 37
- Video albums: 2

The discography of MercyMe, an American Christian rock band, includes 11 studio albums, two compilation albums, two video albums, and 28 singles. MercyMe, formed in 1994, released six independent albums from 1995–2000 before signing with INO Records and releasing their major label debut album, Almost There (2001). Almost There peaked at No. 37 on the Billboard 200 and No. 1 on the Billboard Christian Albums chart. The band released Spoken For, their second studio album, in 2002; it peaked at No. 2 on the Billboard Christian Albums chart and No. 41 on the Billboard 200. Its second single, "Word of God Speak", spent a record 23 weeks atop the Billboard Christian Songs chart. The album has been certified Gold by the Recording Industry Association of America (RIAA), and has sold over 550,000 copies. In 2003, mainstream radio interest in "I Can Only Imagine", the band's second single from Almost There, caused sales of the album to surge. "I Can Only Imagine" would peak at No. 5 on the Billboard Adult Contemporary chart and No. 71 on the Billboard Hot 100. Almost There was eventually certified triple Platinum by the RIAA, signifying shipments of over 3,000,000 copies, and has sold over 2.2 million copies in the United States.

In 2004, the band released their third album, Undone, which sold 55,000 copies in its first week, debuting at No. 12 on the Billboard 200 and at No. 1 on the Christian Albums chart. Undone earned a Gold certification from the RIAA in December 2004 and has sold over 627,000 copies in the United States. Its three singles all peaked inside the top three on the Christian Songs chart, with two of them ("Here with Me" and "Homesick") crossing over to the Adult Contemporary chart. The band released Coming Up to Breathe, their fourth studio album, in 2006. The album debuted at No. 13 on the Billboard 200 and at No. 1 on the Christian Albums chart with 58,000 copies sold in its first week. "Coming Up to Breathe" earned a Gold certification from the RIAA in 2007.

All That Is Within Me, the band's fifth studio album, was released in 2007. It sold over 84,000 copies in its first week, debuting at No. 15 on the Billboard 200 and at No. 1 on the Christian Albums chart., and was certified Gold by the RIAA in 2010. Their sixth studio album, The Generous Mr. Lovewell, was released in 2010 and sold 88,000 copies in its first week. It became their first top 10 album on the Billboard 200, debuting at No. 3. All three of its singles peaked at No. 1 on the Christian Songs chart, and the album has been certified Gold by the RIAA. MercyMe's seventh studio album, The Hurt & The Healer, sold 33,000 copies in its first week, debuting at No. 7 on the Billboard 200. Their 2014 studio album, Welcome to the New, debuted at No. 4 on the Billboard 200 chart, selling 26,000 copies in its first week.

== Albums ==
=== Independent albums ===
List of albums
Title	Album details
Pleased to Meet You	Released: 1995; Format: CD
Traces of Rain	Released: 1997; Format: CD, cassette
Traces of Rain Volume II	Released: 1998; Format: CD, cassette
The Need	Released: May 1999; Format: CD, cassette
The Worship Project	Released: October 1999; Format: CD
Look	Released: 2000; Format: CD

=== Studio albums ===
List of albums, with selected chart positions and certifications
Title	Album details	Peak chart positions				Certifications
Title	Album details	US	US Christ	CAN	UK C&G	Certifications
Almost There	Released: August 14, 2001; Label: INO, Curb; Format: CD, digital download	37	1	—	—	RIAA: 3× Platinum
Spoken For	Released: October 1, 2002; Label: INO, Word; Format: CD, digital download	41	2	—	—	RIAA: Gold
Undone	Released: April 20, 2004; Label: INO, Epic; Format: CD, digital download	12	1	—	—	RIAA: Gold
Coming Up to Breathe	Released: April 25, 2006; Label: INO, Columbia; Format: CD, digital download	13	1	—	—	RIAA: Gold
All That Is Within Me	Released: November 20, 2007; Label: INO, Columbia; Format: CD, digital download	15	1	—	—	RIAA: Gold
The Generous Mr. Lovewell	Released: May 4, 2010; Label: INO, Columbia; Format: CD, digital download	3	1	—	—	RIAA: Gold
The Hurt & The Healer	Released: May 22, 2012; Label: Fair Trade, Columbia; Format: CD, digital download	7	1	—	—	
Welcome to the New	Released: April 8, 2014; Label: Fair Trade; Format: CD, digital download	4	1	—	16	RIAA: Gold
Lifer	Released: March 31, 2017; Label: Fair Trade; Format: CD, LP, digital download	10	1	95	8	RIAA: Gold
Inhale (Exhale)	Released: April 30, 2021; Label: Fair Trade; Format: CD, digital download	78	3	—	14	
Always Only Jesus	Released: October 21, 2022; Label: Fair Trade; Format: CD, LP, digital download	126	1	—	17	
Wonder & Awe	Released: August 8, 2025; Label: Fair Trade, Columbia; Format: CD, LP, digital download	— (Note: Wonder & Awe did not enter the Billboard 200, but peaked at No. 34 on the Top Album Sales)	5	—	—	

=== Christmas albums ===
List of albums, with selected chart positions
Title	Album details	Peak chart positions			Certifications
Title	Album details	US	US Christ	US Holiday	Certifications
The Christmas Sessions	Released: September 27, 2005; Label: INO, Epic; Format: CD, digital download	64	3	10	RIAA: Gold
MercyMe, It's Christmas!	Released: October 9, 2015; Label: Fair Trade; Format: CD, digital download	38	1	1	

=== Compilation albums ===
List of albums, with selected chart positions
Title	Album details	Peak chart positions		
Title	Album details	US	US Christ	UK C&G
10	Released: April 7, 2009; Label: INO, Columbia; Format: CD/DVD, digital download	18	1	—
Playlist: The Very Best of MercyMe	Released: October 15, 2013; Label: Fair Trade/Legacy; Format: CD, digital download	—	25	—
I Can Only Imagine: The Very Best of MercyMe	Released: March 2, 2018; Label: Fair Trade; Format: CD, digital download	23	1	18
"—" denotes releases that did not chart

=== Video albums ===
List of albums, with selected chart positions and certifications
Title	Album details	Peak chart positions	Certifications
Title	Album details	US Video	Certifications
Yesterday, Today and Tomorrow	Released: November 19, 2002; Label: INO; Format: DVD	—	
MercyMe Live	Released: September 14, 2004; Label: INO, Epic; Format: DVD	25	RIAA: Platinum

=== Other albums ===
List of albums, with selected chart positions
Title	Album details	Peak chart positions
Title	Album details	US Christ
Coming Up to Breathe: Acoustic	Released: January 30, 2007; Label: INO, Columbia; Format: CD, digital download	22
iTunes Originals	Released: March 18, 2008; Label: INO, Columbia; Format: Digital download	—
The Worship Sessions	Released: August 30, 2011; Label: Fair Trade, Columbia; Format: CD, digital download	33
"—" denotes releases that did not chart

== Singles ==
=== As lead artist ===
List of singles, with selected chart positions and certifications
Title	Year	Peak chart positions						Certifications	Album
Title	Year	US	US AC	US Christ	US Christ Air	US Christ Digital	FRA	Certifications	Album
"Bless Me Indeed (Jabez's Song)"	2001	—	—	— (Note: "Bless Me Indeed (Jabez's Song)" was released before the Billboard Christian Songs and Christian Airplay charts were created.)		—	—		Almost There
"I Can Only Imagine"	2001	71	5	1	26	1	65	RIAA: 5× Platinum	Almost There
"Spoken For"	2002	—	—	— (Note: "Spoken For" was released before the Billboard Christian Songs and Christian Airplay Songs charts were created.)		—	—		Spoken For
"Word of God Speak"	2003	—	—	1		—	—	RIAA: Platinum	Spoken For
"The Change Inside of Me"	2003	—	—	—		—	—		Spoken For
"Here with Me"	2004	—	12	1		—	—		Undone
"Homesick"	2004	—	9	3		—	—		Undone
"In the Blink of an Eye"	2005	—	—	1		—	—		Undone
"Joseph's Lullaby"	2005	—	33	1		29	—		The Christmas Sessions
"So Long Self"	2006	—	16	1		—	—		Coming Up to Breathe
"Hold Fast"	2006	—	27	3		—	—		Coming Up to Breathe
"Bring the Rain"	2007	—	—	1		—	—		Coming Up to Breathe
"God with Us"	2007	—	—	1		—	—		All That Is Within Me
"You Reign"	2008	—	—	2		—	—		All That Is Within Me
"Finally Home"	2009	—	16	3		—	—		All That Is Within Me
"All of Creation"	2010	— (Note: "All of Creation" did not appear on the Hot 100, but peaked at No. 11 on Bubbling Under Hot 100 Singles chart. It also peaked at No. 8 on the component Hot Singles Sales chart.)	—	1		2	—		The Generous Mr. Lovewell
"Beautiful"	2010	—	—	1		9	—		The Generous Mr. Lovewell
"Move"	2011	— (Note: "Move" did not appear on the Hot 100, but peaked at No. 20 on Bubbling Under Hot 100 Singles chart.)	—	1		5	—		The Generous Mr. Lovewell
"The Hurt & The Healer"	2012	—	—	1		4	—		The Hurt & The Healer
"You Are I Am"	2012	—	—	3		14	—		The Hurt & The Healer
"Shake"	2013	—	—	6	9	2	—		Welcome to the New
"Greater"	2014	— (Note: "Greater" did not enter the Hot 100, but peaked at No. 14 on Bubbling Under Hot 100 Singles chart.)	—	2	1	2	—	RIAA: Gold	Welcome to the New
"Flawless"	2015	—	—	2	1	3	—	RIAA: Gold	Welcome to the New
"Dear Younger Me"	2016	—	—	6	3	10	—		Welcome to the New
"Even If"	2017	— (Note: "Even If" did not appear on the Hot 100, but peaked at No. 20 on Bubbling Under Hot 100 Singles chart.)	—	1	1	1	—	RIAA: 3× Platinum	Lifer
"Grace Got You" (featuring John Reuben)	2018	—	—	3	1	2	—	RIAA: Gold	Lifer
"Best News Ever"	2018	—	—	4	1	14	—		Lifer
"Almost Home"	2019	—	—	3	1	6	—	RIAA: Gold	Inhale (Exhale)
"Have Yourself a Merry Little Christmas"	2019	—	—	—	38	—	—		non-album single
"Hurry Up and Wait"	2020	—	—	30	—	8	—		Inhale (Exhale)
"Say I Won't"	2020	—	—	4	4	3	—	RIAA: Gold	Inhale (Exhale)
"On Our Way" (featuring Sam Wesley)	2021	—	—	14	8	—	—		Inhale (Exhale)
"Then Christ Came" (solo or featuring Phil Wickham)	2022	—	—	3	1	9	—		Always Only Jesus
"To Not Worship You"	2023	—	—	5	1	21	—		Always Only Jesus
"Always Only Jesus"	2023	—	—	11	5	—	—		Always Only Jesus
"Oh Death"	2025	—	—	9	2	6	—		Wonder & Awe
"Make It Well"	2025	—	—	12	3	1	—		Non-album singles
"Wake Up, Sleeper"	2026	—	—	33	21	—	—		Non-album singles
"—" denotes releases that did not chart

=== As featured artist ===
List of singles, with selected chart positions
Title	Year	Peak chart positions		Album
Title	Year	US Christ	US Christ AC	Album
"I See Love" (with Steven Curtis Chapman and Third Day)	2004	21	25	The Passion of the Christ: Songs

== Promotional singles ==
List of promotional singles
Title	Year	Album
"Sing (Like You've Already Won)"	2025	Wonder & Awe
"Heartbroken Hallelujah"	2025	Wonder & Awe
"—" denotes releases that did not chart

== Other charted songs ==
List of charting songs, with selected chart positions
Title	Year	Peak chart positions				Album
Title	Year	US Christ	US Christ Airplay	US Christ AC	US AC	Album
"O Holy Night"	2004	24		22	—	non-album release
"Silent Night"	2005	30		26	6	The Christmas Sessions
"The Little Drummer Boy"	2005	10		10	—	The Christmas Sessions
"It Came Upon a Midnight Clear"	2005	22		21	—	The Christmas Sessions
"God Rest Ye Merry Gentlemen"	2006	9		9	34	The Christmas Sessions
"Gloria"	2006	26		27	—	The Christmas Sessions
"Rockin' Around the Christmas Tree"	2006	37		35	25	The Christmas Sessions
"No More No Less"	2007	30		23	—	Coming Up to Breathe
"This Life"	2010	— (Note: "This Life" did not enter the Hot Christian Songs or Christian Airplay charts, but peaked at No. 19 on Christian Digital Song Sales chart.)		—	—	The Generous Mr. Lovewell
"Free"	2010	— (Note: "Free" did not enter the Hot Christian Songs or Christian Airplay charts, but peaked at No. 28 on the Christian Digital Song Sales chart.)		—	—	The Generous Mr. Lovewell
"Finish What He Started"	2014	33	—	—	—	Welcome to the New
"Our Lullaby"	2015	49	37	16	—	MercyMe, It's Christmas
"Go Tell It on the Mountain"	2015	39	30	24	—	MercyMe, It's Christmas
"Christmastime Again"	2015	32	23	12	—	MercyMe, It's Christmas
"Sleigh Ride"	2016	50	30	21	—	MercyMe, It's Christmas
"Joy"	2016	29	19	12	—	MercyMe, It's Christmas
"Lifer"	2017	42	—	—	—	Lifer
"Happy Dance"	2017	35	—	—	—	Lifer
"I Can Only Imagine (The Movie Session)"	2018	16	26	28	—	I Can Only Imagine: The Very Best of MercyMe
"Wonder & Awe"	2025	48	—	—	—	Wonder & Awe
"—" denotes releases that did not chart
