= List of awards and nominations received by MercyMe =

MercyMe awards and nominations
- MercyMe performing on August 12, 2012 in Shelby, North Carolina
Awards and nominations
Award	Wins	Nominations
American Music Awards	2	4
Billboard Music Awards	0	4
Dove Awards	6	28
Grammy Awards	0	1

Totals (Note: Certain award groups do not simply award one winner. They acknowledge several different recipients, have runners-up, and have third place. Since this is a specific recognition and is different from losing an award, runner-up mentions are considered wins in this award tally. For simplification and to avoid errors, each award in this list has been presumed to have had a prior nomination.)
- Wins: 8
- Nominations: 27

MercyMe is an American contemporary Christian music band based in Greenville, Texas. The band formed in 1994 and released six independent records from 1995-2000 before signing with INO Records and releasing their major-label debut, Almost There, in 2001. They have since released six other studio albums as well as a holiday album.

MercyMe has been awarded the American Music Award for Favorite Contemporary Inspirational Artist twice, in 2004 and 2010. At the 35th GMA Dove Awards, the band received the awards for Artist of the Year and Group of the Year, while their song "Word of God Speak" received the award for Pop/Contemporary Song of the Year; they also received that award in 2001 with their song "I Can Only Imagine". Their album "Undone" received the award for Dove Award for Pop/Contemporary Album of the Year in 2005. Coming Up to Breathe was nominated for the Dove Award for Pop/Contemporary Album of the Year as well as the Grammy Award for Best Pop/Contemporary Gospel Album.

== American Music Awards ==
The American Music Awards are awarded for achievements in the American record industry. MercyMe has been nominated for four awards, winning two of them.

Year	Award	Result
2003 (November)	Contemporary Inspirational Artist	Nominated
2004	Contemporary Inspirational Artist	Won
2008	Contemporary Inspirational Artist	Nominated
2010	Contemporary Inspirational Artist	Won

== Billboard Music Awards ==
The Billboard Music Awards reflect Billboard "chart rankings based on key fan interactions with music, including album sales and downloads, track downloads, radio airplay and touring as well as streaming and social interactions on Facebook, Twitter, Vevo, YouTube, Spotify and other popular online destinations for music". MercyMe has been nominated for four awards.

Year	Nominee / work	Award	Result
2011	The Generous Mr. Lovewell	Top Christian Album	Nominated
2011	–	Top Christian Artist	Nominated
2011	"All of Creation"	Top Christian Song	Nominated
2012	–	Top Christian Artist	Nominated
"—" denotes nomination was not for a work

== Dove Awards ==
The GMA Dove Awards honor artists in the genres of Christian music and Gospel music. MercyMe has been nominated for 18 awards, winning 6 of them.

Year	Nominee / work	Award	Result
2002	"I Can Only Imagine"	Pop/Contemporary Recorded Song of the Year	Won
2003	–	Artist of the Year	Nominated
2003	–	Group of the Year	Nominated
2003	Spoken For	Pop/Contemporary Album of the Year	Nominated
2004	–	Artist of the Year	Won
2004	–	Group of the Year	Won
2004	"Word of God Speak"	Pop/Contemporary Recorded Song of the Year	Won
2005	–	Artist of the Year	Nominated
2005	–	Group of the Year	Nominated
2005	Undone	Pop/Contemporary Album of the Year	Won
2005	The Passion of the Christ: Songs	Special Event Album of the Year	Won
2005	MercyMe Live	Long Form Music Video of the Year	Nominated
2006	–	Group of the Year	Nominated
2007	–	Group of the Year	Nominated
2007	Coming Up to Breathe	Pop/Contemporary Album of the Year	Nominated
2008	–	Group of the Year	Nominated
2010	–	Group of the Year	Nominated
2010	"All of Creation"	Pop/Contemporary Recorded Song of the Year	Nominated
"—" denotes that award was not for a work

== Grammy Awards ==
The Grammy Awards are awarded annually by The Recording Academy and honor "artistic achievement, technical proficiency and overall excellence in the recording industry, without regard to album sales or chart position". MercyMe has been nominated for one award.

Year	Nominee / work	Award	Result
2007	Coming Up to Breathe	Best Pop/Contemporary Gospel Album	Nominated
