= I Can Only Imagine =

I Can Only Imagine may refer to:

- "I Can Only Imagine" (MercyMe song), a 2001 song
- "I Can Only Imagine" (David Guetta song), a 2012 song
- I Can Only Imagine (film), a 2018 film based on the MercyMe song
- "I Can Only Imagine", a song by Poco from Running Horse

== See also ==
- I Can Only Imagine: The Very Best of MercyMe, a 2018 MercyMe compilation album
