= Spoken For =

Studio album by MercyMe
- Released: October 1, 2002
- Recorded: 2002 in the United States
- Studios: Luminous Sound (Dallas, TX); The Sound Kitchen (Franklin, TN); Indigo Room (Franklin, TN); HydeAway Sound Lab (Jeckyll Island, GA); The Scwoodio (Greenville, TX); Mountain View Recorders (Glorieta, NM); Playground Recording (Wylie, TX)
- Genres: Adult contemporary; pop rock; roots rock
- Length: 37:58
- Label: INO
- Producer: Pete Kipley

MercyMe chronology
Almost There (2001)	Spoken For (2002)	Undone (2004)

Singles from Spoken For
- 1. "Spoken For" Released: September 20, 2002; 2. "Word of God Speak" Released: April 2003; 3. "The Change Inside of Me" Released: May 2, 2003

Spoken For is the second studio album by Christian rock band MercyMe. Produced by Pete Kipley, the album was released on October 1, 2002, by INO Records. The album's production, which followed the success of "I Can Only Imagine" on Christian radio, was described by lead singer Bart Millard as "nerve-racking"; the album musically represents a shift in the band's musical style, with critics variously identifying it as roots rock, pop rock, or adult contemporary. Lyrically, the album focuses on worship and the concept of Christians as being "spoken for" by God.

Critics praised Spoken For as a progression from Almost There and a more cohesive album overall, with some finding it to be more refined lyrically and musically. The album's stylistic shift was praised, along with Millard's lyrics and vocals. Spoken For was nominated for Pop/Contemporary Album of the Year at the 34th GMA Dove Awards, and at the 35th GMA Dove Awards "Word of God Speak" received the awards for Song of the Year and Pop/Contemporary Recorded Song of the Year.

Spoken For sold 23,000 copies in its first week, debuting at number 41 on the Billboard 200 and number two on the Christian Albums chart. Three singles were released in support of Spoken For; the title track, which peaked at number one on the Radio & Records Christian AC and INSPO charts, "Word of God Speak", which spent a record 23 weeks at the top of the Billboard Christian Songs chart, and "The Change Inside of Me", which peaked at number eight on the Radio & Records Christian CHR chart. The album was certified gold by the RIAA in October 2003 and has sold over 553,000 copies as of May 2004; it ranked as the 46th-best selling Christian album of the 2000s according to Billboard.

== Background and recording ==
Bart Millard, MercyMe's lead singer, described the process of creating Spoken For as "nerve-racking". Following the success of "I Can Only Imagine, which became the group's first major hit on Christian radio and received the Song of the Year award at the Dove Awards, the band felt that they were more closely associated with the adult contemporary genre than their roots as a rock band; Millard described Spoken For as "a little edgier" than that reputation. According to Millard, the band had "a lot of input" on the album. Describing the album's concept, Millard said it focused on "the glory of God and how amazing it is that we could be saved by such a God" and that God would call the listeners his own. Millard said the album was "a little bit more on the rock side" and that the major goal was to provide "singable" songs suitable for corporate worship. The album's title came from Millard, who said that he had been "consumed with the idea that God is so crazy in love with us — just knowing that we are part of something bigger and we worship a God who’s in complete control no matter how good or bad things get. The phrase "spoken for" really stuck with me".

Spoken For was recorded by Csaba Petozz, J. R. McNeely, Lee Bridges, and Jim Bryson in several locations: Luminous Sound in Dallas, Texas, The Sound Kitchen in Franklin, Tennessee, Indigo Room in Franklin, Tennessee, HydeAway Sound Lab in Jeckyll Island, Georgia, The Scwoodio in Greenville, Texas, Mountain View Recorders in Glorieta, New Mexico, and Playground Recording in Wylie, Texas. It was mastered by Richard Dodd at Vital Recordings, and mixed by F. Reid Shippen at Recording Arts in Nashville, Tennessee, with the exceptions of "All Because of This", "Word of God Speak, and "Love of God", (which were mixed at Salvo Mix by Salvo), and "Go" (which was mixed by McNeely).

== Composition ==
"The Change Inside of Me"
"The Change Inside of Me" was noted as being an upbeat pop rock song.

"Spoken For"
The album's title track was described as "haunting" and "offers a look at Jesus recognizing His children at heaven’s gate".

"Word of God Speak"
The sparse arrangement of "Word of God Speak", incorporating only piano, vocals, and strings, mirror's the song's lyrical theme.

Spoken For has been described as roots rock, pop rock, and adult contemporary. The album was noted as being a stylistic shift from Almost There; and some critics felt the album was a more cohesive work than Almost There. The album's style was noted as being similar to that of Train and Steven Curtis Chapman. Allmusic described it as having "ringing guitar melodies, infectious vocal harmonies, atmospheric keyboards, and charging, often exhilarating rhythms".

The songs on Spoken For are generally guitar-driven. In comparison to some other Christian rock groups, the lyrics on Spoken For are overtly Christian in theme. Russ Breimeier of Christianity Today described the album's lyrics as adopting a "broader" definition of worship than the band had previously used, being "more thoughtful" but "still catchy and vertically focused". Millard's vocals on the album were noted as being "warm" and "crystal-clear".

"The Change Inside of Me" and "All the Above" were noted as being "firmly rooted in the pop side of adult contemporary music", with the latter song focusing on "the elation that rang through the heavens when we became children of God" (The moment you surrendered/the moment you were saved/Life as you knew it forever was changed/And all the above rejoiced). The album's title track was described as "haunting"; lyrically, it "offers a look at Jesus recognizing His children at heaven’s gate". "There's a Reason" was noted as being "worshipful". "Word of God Speak" features only piano and strings alongside Millard's vocals; according to Millard, the sparse musical arrangement mirrors the song's lyrics, which focus on the inability to describe an infinite god with a limited vocabulary.

== Release ==
Spoken For was released on October 1, 2002. It sold 23,000 copies in its first week, debuting at number 41 on the Billboard 200 and number two on the Christian Albums chart. In a promotional deal with Walmart, the first 75,000 copies sold at Walmart included a "special unplugged" version of "I Can Only Imagine". The album's title track, "Spoken For", was released as the lead single from Spoken For on September 20, 2002; it peaked at number one on the Radio & Records Christian AC and INSPO charts, spending seven and six weeks at the top of the charts, respectively, and at number six on the Radio & Records Christian CHR chart. The album's second single, "Word of God Speak", was released to radio in April 2003 and on a CD single release with "I Can Only Imagine" on September 23, 2003. The song spent 23 weeks at number one on the Billboard Christian Songs chart, a record that stood for over 10 years before being passed in August 2014 by Hillsong United's single Oceans (Where Feet May Fail)", but remains the record on the component Christian Airplay chart. (Note: In November 2013, Billboard changed the methodology of the Christian Songs chart, incorporating streaming and sales numbers as well as mainstream radio airplay into the chart's rankings. Christian airplay rankings were split into the separate Christian Airplay chart, and both the Christian Songs and Christian Airplay chart share a common history prior to November 28, 2013.) It also spent 21 weeks atop the Billboard Hot Christian AC chart, ten weeks at number one on the Radio & Records Christian AC chart, and nine weeks at number one on the Radio & Records INSPO chart, and ranked at number one on the decade-end Billboard Christian Songs and Christian AC charts. "The Change Inside of Me" was released to Christian contemporary hit radio on May 2, 2003, peaking at number eight on the Radio & Records Christian CHR chart.

Spoken For spent 29 weeks on the Billboard 200 and 91 weeks on the Christian Albums chart. The album also spent one week on the Catalog Albums chart in December 2004, peaking at number six. It is the band's only studio album not to have reached the number one spot on the Christian Albums chart. Billboard ranked Spoken For as the tenth-best selling Christian album of 2003, the 20th-best selling Christian album of 2004, and the 46th best-selling Christian album of the 2000s. The RIAA certified the album gold in October 2003, signifying shipments of over 500,000 copies. As of May 2004, Spoken For has sold over 553,000 copies.

== Critical reception ==
Professional ratings
Review scores
Source	Rating
Allmusic	3.5/5 stars
Dayton Daily News	B−
New Release Tuesday	4/5 stars
Christianity Today	2.5/5 stars
Cross Rhythms	7/10 squares

Spoken For received generally positive reviews. Critics reacted positively to the album's shift in style from Almost There, as well as to Millard's vocals and its lyrical content. Allmusic gave the album 3.5 out of 5 stars, saying that MercyMe "shows its knack for mating spiritual lyrics to state-of-the-art pop-rock". The album received a B− from James Lloyd of the Dayton Daily News, who praised the album's ballads, lyrics, and vocals but said that some of up-tempo numbers "almost seem like filler". New Release Tuesday's Kevin McNeese gave the album four out of five stars, praising its music as "encouraging and inspirational" and saying it provides "some of the finest moments in praise and worship". Russ Breimeier of Christianity Today gave the album 2.5 out of 5 stars. Breimeier praised the album for its cohesiveness and described it as a major improvement over the band's debut album Almost There musically and lyrically, but criticized the album's track order as "[making] the album seem more repetitive than it really is". The album received 7 out of 10 squares from Tony Cummings of Cross Rhythms, who praised the album as "intelligent" and "well-crafted" and complemented its lyrics and production.

Wendy Lee Nentwig of Crosswalk.com praised the band's musical and lyrical growth since their debut effort, as well as the "passionate intensity and emotion" of lead singer Bart Millard's vocals. Marcia Bartenhagen of CCM Magazine praised the band's vocals and progression in songwriting and musical style, but felt the album "occasionally sways to the triteness so often found on AC/pop projects". Tim Harms of Baptist Press called Spoken For a major improvement over Almost There and said it "feels more coherent and flows smoother and it flourishes in vertical lyrics". Brian Bowers of Stars and Stripes called the album a "step forward" for the band, but that fans would "still get what they liked on [Almost There]".

Spoken For was nominated for Pop/Contemporary Album of the Year at the 34th GMA Dove Awards. At the 35th GMA Dove Awards, "Word of God Speak" received the awards for Song of the Year and Pop/Contemporary Recorded Song of the Year.

== Track listing ==
All songs written by Jim Bryson, Nathan Cochran, Pete Kipley, Bart Millard, Mike Scheuchzer and Robby Shaffer except where noted.

No.	Title	Writer(s)	Length
1.	"The Change Inside of Me"		3:24
2.	"All The Above"	Millard, Cochran, Scheuchzer, Bryson, Shaffer, Kipley, Mark Stuart	3:23
3.	"Spoken For"		4:09
4.	"There's A Reason"		4:11
5.	"Come One, Come All"		3:50
6.	"Crazy"	Millard, Kipley, Robby Hurd, Chad Sipes	4:38
7.	"Word of God Speak"	Millard, Kipley	3:07
8.	"Your Glory Goes On"		2:39
9.	"Love of God" (Arrangement by Millard, Cochran, Scheuchzer, Bryson, Shaffer, Kipley)	Frederick M. Lehman	3:33
10.	"Go"		3:27
11.	"All Because Of This"		1:37

== Personnel ==
Credits adapted from the album liner notes.

MercyMe

- Bart Millard – lead vocals, backing vocals, arrangements on "The Love of God"
- Jim Bryson – keys
- Mike Scheuchzer – guitars
- Nathan Cochran – bass
- Robby Shaffer – drums

Additional performers

- Travis Cottrell – backing vocals
- Will Owsley – backing vocals
- Pete Kipley – string arrangements
- Roy G. Biv String Vibe – strings

Production and Technical

- Pete Kipley – producer
- Lee Bridges – recording, digital editing
- Jim Bryson – recording
- J. R. McNeely – recording
- Csaba Petocz – recording
- F. Reid Shippen – mixing (1–4, 6, 8, 10)
- Dan Shike – mix assistant (1–4, 6, 8)
- Salvo – mixing (5, 7, 9, 11)
- Richard Dodd – mastering
- Bridgett O'Lannerghty – project administration
- Kristin Barlowe – photography
- Laurel Cacace – inside booklet element photography
- Dan Harding – design, art direction
- Dana Salsedo – art direction
- BrickHouse Entertainment – management
- Mixed at Recording Arts and Salvomix (Nashville, Tennessee).
- Mastered at Vital Recordings (Nashville, Tennessee).

== Charts and certifications ==
Weekly album charts
Chart (2002)	Peak position
US Billboard 200	41
US Christian Albums (Billboard)	2
Chart (2004)	Peak position
US Catalog Albums (Billboard)	6

Weekly single charts
Year	Song	Peak chart positions			
Year	Song	US Christ	Christ AC	Christ CHR	INSPO
2002	"Spoken For"	— (Note: "Spoken For" was released before the Christian Songs chart was created.)	1	6	1
2003	"Word of God Speak"	1	1	25	1
2003	"The Change Inside of Me"	—	—	8	—

Year-end charts
Chart (2003)	Peak position
US Christian Albums (Billboard)	10
Chart (2004)	Peak position
US Christian Albums (Billboard)	20

Decade-end album charts
Chart (2000s)	Peak position
US Christian Albums (Billboard)	46

Certifications
Country	Certification	Units shipped
United States	Gold	500,000
