= Shake (MercyMe song) =

Single by MercyMe

from the album Welcome to the New
- Released: November 14, 2013 (radio); November 20, 2013 (digital download)
- Genre: CCM, Christian rock, adult contemporary, alternative rock
- Length: 3:13
- Label: Fair Trade/Columbia
- Songwriters: MercyMe, David Garcia, Ben Glover, Solomon Olds
- Producers: Garcia, Glover

MercyMe singles chronology
"You Know Better" (2013)	"Shake" (2013)	"Greater" (2014)

"Shake" is the lead single on MercyMe's eighth studio album Welcome to the New. On April 22, 2014, MercyMe performed the song on Today with Kathie Lee and Hoda. The song was nominated for Best Contemporary Christian Music Performance/Song at the 57th Annual Grammy Awards.

== Weekly charts ==
Weekly chart performance for "Shake"
Chart (2014)	Peak position
Christian Adult Contemporary (Billboard)	8
US Christian Airplay (Billboard)	9
US Hot Christian Songs (Billboard)	6

== Release and radio history ==
Date	Territory	Label	Format
November 14, 2013	United States	Fair Trade Services	Radio
November 20, 2013	United States	Fair Trade Services	Digital download
