= The Change Inside of Me =

2003 single by MercyMe

Single by MercyMe

from the album Spoken For
- Released: May 2, 2003
- Recorded: Various locations in the United States
- Genre: Rock, pop rock, adult contemporary
- Length: 3:24
- Label: INO
- Songwriters: James Bryson, Nathan Cochran, Michael John Scheuchzer, Bart Millard, Robin Shaffer, Pete Kipley
- Producer: Kipley

MercyMe singles chronology
"Word of God Speak" (2003)	"The Change Inside of Me" (2003)	"Here with Me" (2004)

"The Change Inside of Me" is a song by Christian rock band MercyMe. Written by MercyMe and Pete Kipley, it was released on May 2, 2003 as the third single from the band's 2002 album Spoken For. Described as a power ballad, the song incorporates a rock sound featuring guitar and drums; it has also been described as a pop rock and adult contemporary song. The song was received positively by music critics, who praised the song's hook and sound, and peaked at number eight on the Radio & Records Christian AC chart.

== Background ==
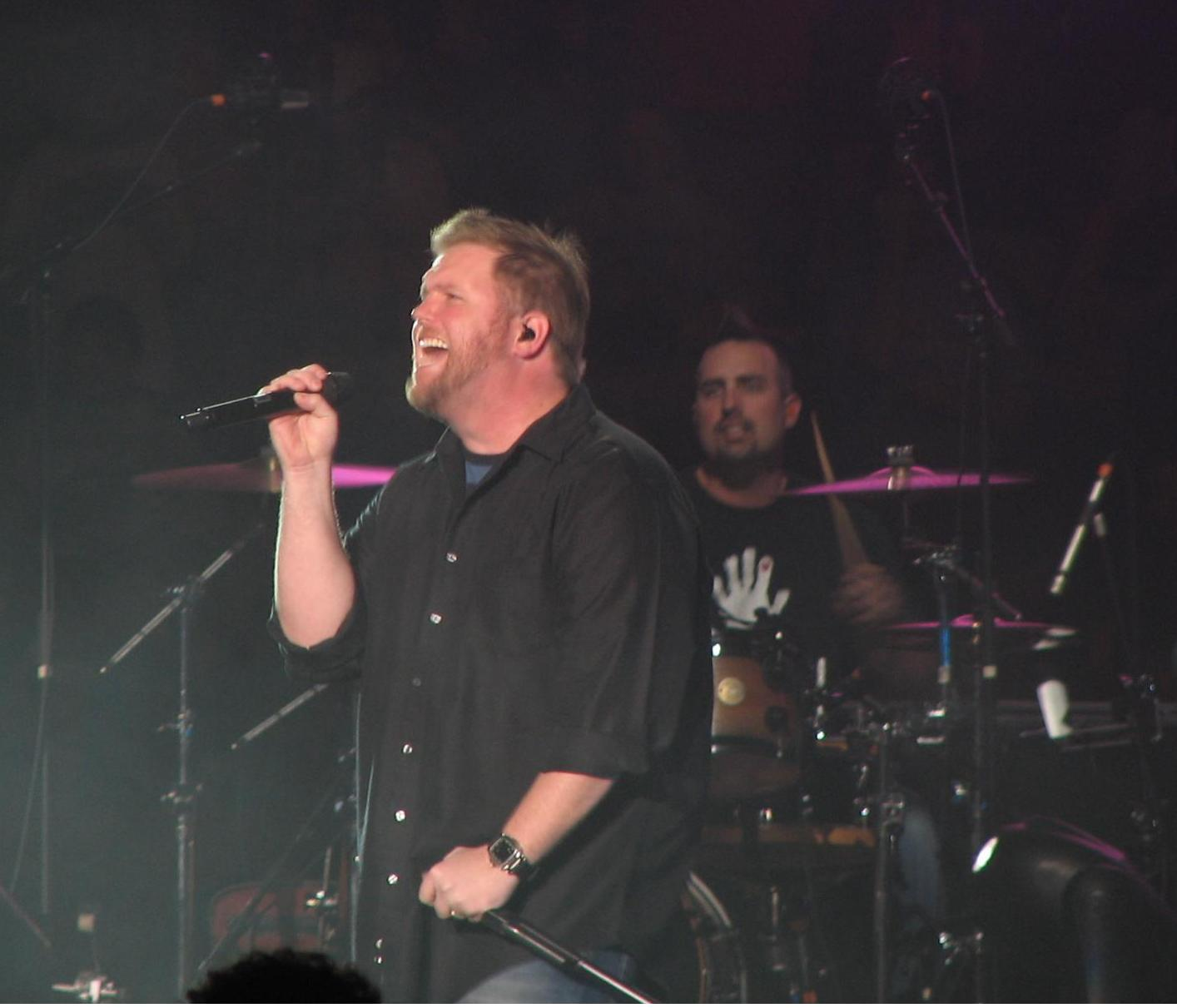
MercyMe's lead singer Bart Millard, who co-wrote the song with the rest of the band and Pete Kipley

"The Change Inside of Me" was written by MercyMe and Pete Kipley; it was also produced by Kipley. Millard, who felt the song was one of his favorites off of Spoken For, said that "When you write an 'I Can Only Imagine,' you're drooling at the mouth to write something up-tempo". Millard felt that he and the band had "outdone" themselves on the song. "The Change Inside of Me" was recorded in several locations; Luminous Sound in Dallas, Texas, The Sound Kitchen in Franklin, Tennessee, Indigo Room in Franklin, Tennessee, HydeAway Sound Lab in Jeckyll Island, Georgia, The Scwoodio in Greenville, Texas, Mountain View Recorders in Glorieta, New Mexico, and Playground Recording in Wylie, Texas. It was mastered by Richard Dodd at Vital Recordings, and mixed by F. Reid Shippen at Recording Arts in Nashville, Tennessee.

== Composition ==
"The Change Inside of Me"
A 21-second audio sample of the song's chorus. It has been noted as displaying a rock beat and has been described as a pop rock and adult contemporary song.

"The Change Inside of Me" is a song with a length of three minutes and twenty-four seconds. According to the sheet music published by Musicnotes.com, it is set in common time in the key of E major and has a tempo of 100 beats per minute. Bart Millard's vocal range in the song spans from the low note of C_{4} to the high note of E_{5}. Musically, the song has been described as a power ballad, featuring the typical rock sound of guitars and drums. It has also been noted as being a "upbeat pop/rock" and "firmly rooted in the pop side of adult contemporary music". Lyrically, the song has been described as being a "simple praise song that reminds us that any positive change in us comes only through Jesus".

== Reception ==
=== Critical response ===
Marcia Bartenhagen of CCM Magazine praised the song's hook, as Russ Breimeier of The Fish praised the song's upbeat sound as being "widely accessible and pleasant to listen to".

=== Release and chart performance ===
"The Change Inside of Me" was released to Christian CHR radio on May 2, 2003. It debuted on the Radio & Records Christian CHR chart for the chart week of July 4, 2003, spending a total of twenty-seven weeks on the chart and peaking at number eight.

== Personnel ==
Credits adapted from the album liner notes. (Note: The band members' instruments are not credited on the album's liner notes, aside from Bryson's role in recording. Their primary instruments are listed based on their de facto primary roles in the group.)

MercyMe

- Bart Millard – lead vocals, background vocals
- Jim Bryson – keys, recording
- Robby Shaffer – drums
- Mike Scheuchzer – guitars
- Nathan Cochran – bass guitar

Additional performers

- Travis Cottrell – background vocals
- Will Owsley – background vocals
- Roy G. Biv String Vibe – strings

Production

- Csaba Petozz – recording
- J. R. McNeely – recording
- Lee Bridges – recording
- Richard Dodd – mastering
- F. Reid Shippen – mixing

== Charts ==
Weekly

Chart (2003)	Peak Position
Radio & Records Christian CHR	8

Year-end

Chart (2003)	Peak Position
Radio & Records Christian CHR	23

== Release history ==
Date	Format	Label
May 2, 2003	Christian CHR radio	INO
