= Spoken For (song) =

Single by MercyMe

from the album Spoken For
- Released: September 2002
- Recorded: 2002 in the United States: Luminous Sound (Dallas, TX); The Sound Kitchen (Franklin, TN); Indigo Room (Franklin, TN); HydeAway Sound Lab (Jeckyll Island, GA); The Scwoodio (Greenville, TX); Mountain View Recorders (Glorieta, NM); Playground Recording (Wylie, TX)
- Genre: Contemporary Christian
- Length: 4:09
- Label: INO
- Songwriters: Bart Millard, Nathan Cochran, Mike Scheuchzer, Jim Bryson, Robby Shaffer, Pete Kipley
- Producer: Kipley

MercyMe singles chronology
"I Can Only Imagine" (2001)	"Spoken For" (2002)	"Word of God Speak" (2003)

"Spoken For" is a song by Christian rock band MercyMe. Written by Bart Millard, Nathan Cochran, Mike Scheuchzer, Jim Bryson, Robby Shaffer, and Pete Kipley. "Spoken For" has been described as "haunting", and as having a "strong lyrical hook".

Spoken For was released in 2002 as the lead single from MercyMe's 2002 album of the same title. It attained success on Christian radio, peaking atop the Radio & Records Christian AC and INPSO charts, as well as at No. 6 on the Radio & Records Christian CHR chart. It was nominated for Song of the Year at the 34th GMA Dove Awards.

== Background ==
"Spoken For" was written by Bart Millard, Nathan Cochran, Mike Scheuchzer, Jim Bryson, Robby Shaffer, and Pete Kipley; it was also produced by Kipley. The song was recorded in several locations; Luminous Sound in Dallas, Texas, The Sound Kitchen in Franklin, Tennessee, Indigo Room in Franklin, Tennessee, HydeAway Sound Lab in Jeckyll Island, Georgia, The Scwoodio in Greenville, Texas, Mountain View Recorders in Glorieta, New Mexico, and Playground Recording in Wylie, Texas. The song was mastered by Richard Dodd at Vital Recordings, and mixed by F. Reid Shippen at Recording Arts in Nashville, Tennessee.

== Composition ==
"Spoken For" is a contemporary Christian song with a length of four minutes and nine seconds. The song is set in the key of D major and has a tempo of eighty beats per minute, with a vocal range spanning from A_{3}-F_{5}

The verse for "Spoken For" (“Take this world from me/I don’t need it anymore/I am finally free/My heart is spoken for”) has been described as "memorable", while the song itself has been described as "haunting". The song's lyrical hook has been described as "strong".

== Reception ==
=== Critical reception ===
"Spoken For" received generally positive reviews from critics. Kevin McNeese of New Release Tuesday commented that "["Spoken For"] ...reminds us of the importance and adoration that God places on us". Russ Breimeier of Christianity Today commented that the song is "worshipful", also commenting that "MercyMe is destined for another big hit with ["Spoken For"]... I don't think it'll have the same impact as their signature hit, but it's enough to firmly establish MercyMe's popularity". Tony Cummings of Cross Rhythms opined in his review of the album that "I particularly liked the haunting “Spoken For”".

"Spoken For" was nominated for Song of the Year at the 34th GMA Dove Awards.

=== Chart performance ===
"Spoken For" peaked at No. 1 on the Radio & Records Christian AC chart, holding that spot for a total of seven weeks. In all, it spent 36 weeks on the chart. On the Radio & Records INSPO chart, "Spoken For" held the top spot for six weeks, and spent a total of 21 weeks on the chart. On the Radio & Records Christian CHR chart, "Spoken For" peaked at No. 6, spending a total of 28 weeks on the chart.

== Charts ==
Chart (2002–2003)	Peak Position
US R&R Christian AC	1
US R&R INSPO	1
US R&R Christian CHR	6

== Personnel ==
Credits adapted from the album liner notes. (Note: The band members' instruments are not credited on the album's liner notes, aside from Bryson's role in recording. Their primary instruments are listed based on their de facto primary roles in the group.)

MercyMe

- Bart Millard – lead vocals, background vocals
- Jim Bryson – keys, recording
- Robby Shaffer – drums
- Mike Scheuchzer – guitars
- Nathan Cochran – bass guitar

Additional performers

- Travis Cottrell – background vocals
- Will Owsley – background vocals
- Roy G. Biv String Vibe – strings

Production

- Csaba Petozz – recording
- J. R. McNeely – recording
- Lee Bridges – recording
- Richard Dodd – mastering
- F. Reid Shippen – mixing
