= Jabez (biblical figure) =

Biblical figure

Jabez is a man appearing in the Book of Chronicles. He is implied to be ancestor of the Kings of Judah, although not explicitly included in the lineage. His mother named him Jabez (Hebrew יַעְבֵּץ [ya'betz]), meaning "he makes sorrowful", because his birth was difficult. Jabez's most important action was to conquer new territory with divine sanction.

Although the textual description of Jabez is brief, some Targumim elaborate that Jabez also established a religious institution for the Levite children of Zipporah: "And he was called Jabez, because in his council he instituted a school of 31 disciples; they were called Tirathim, because in their hymns their voice was like trumpets; and Shimaathim, because in hearing they lifted up their faces, i.e., in prayer; and Suchathim, because they were overshadowed by the Spirit of prophecy."

Jabez' prays in 1 Chronicles 4:10, "Oh that You would bless me indeed and enlarge my territory! Let Your hand be with me, and keep me from the evil one." This prayer received popular attention in 2000 with the publication of Bruce Wilkinson's book The Prayer of Jabez. In 2001 MercyMe released "Bless Me Indeed (Jabez's Song)".

In Arabic and Persian, Jabez is transliterated as Yabis or Yabiz ( يَعْبِيصَ ). However, Syriac and Arabic translations use a substantially different transliteration of ainei or "aina", cognate with Hebrew עיני [my eye(s)].

Jabez is also mentioned in 1 Chronicles 2:55, possibly as a place name.
