= The Worship Project =

Studio album by MercyMe
- Released: October 14, 1999
- Genres: Alternative rock, pop, rock, worship
- Length: 48:18
- Producer: MercyMe

MercyMe chronology
The Need (1999)	The Worship Project (1999)	Look (2000)

The Worship Project is the fifth self-released album by American Christian rock band MercyMe. Produced by the band and recorded by Jim Bryson (the band's keyboardist), the album was released on October 14, 1999. In contrast to the band's previous efforts, which were influenced by grunge music, The Worship Project is a worship album. MercyMe wrote songs for the album using a basic verse–chorus style so as to be easy to learn and sing along to and to easily fit on a PowerPoint screen. The album incorporates alternative, rock, and pop musical styles, as well as "rootsy" elements like organs and violins.

Like most independent albums, The Worship Project did not appear on any record charts after its release and received little attention from music critics, with the exception of a review in the UK Christian music magazine Cross Rhythms. However, the album was much more successful than the band's previous efforts, selling over 60,000 copies within a year. The band would release one more album before signing with INO Records and releasing their first major studio album, Almost There (2001). Several songs from The Worship Project were included on the album, including "I Can Only Imagine", which became the band's breakthrough single on Christian and mainstream radio and the best-selling Christian single of all time as of March 2018.

== Background and composition ==
"It's My Joy"
"It's My Joy" has been described as having a "bluesy" sound.

"I Can Only Imagine"
"I Can Only Imagine" was the last song to be written for the album.

MercyMe was formed in 1994 by vocalist Bart Millard, guitarist Mike Scheuchzer, and keyboardist Jim Bryson. The band later brought on drummer Robby Shaffer and bassist Nathan Cochran in 1997. Prior to the release of The Worship Project, MercyMe had released four Christian alternative rock albums, drawing influence from the grunge style popular at the time. While playing live, however, the band realized that their original songs from these albums failed to connect with their audiences. In contrast, their covers of popular worship songs were received positively, leading the band to decide to write and produce a whole album of original worship songs.

The Worship Project was MercyMe's first attempt at producing their own corporate worship songs; the band blended this style with their style as a rock band. According to Millard, the album was written over three days; the band "decided to lock [themselves] in an old Sunday school room" to write the songs for the album. With the exception of "Beautiful", which was written and composed by Cochran, the lyrics on the album were written by Millard, while the music was composed by the entire band. The band utilized a simple verse–chorus format when writing songs the album, with the songs being designed to easily fit on a PowerPoint screen. The only song on the album not to utilize this format, "I Can Only Imagine", was included at the last minute, and only because it was important to Millard, who wrote the song reminiscing about his father's death. The album was recorded at The Pig Sty in Fort Worth, Texas. It was produced by the band, engineered and mixed by Bryson, and mastered by Eric Wolf at Wolf Mastering in Nashville.

The Worship Project has been described as being a worship album, drawing influences from rock, pop, and alternative music. Mike Rimmer of Cross Rhythms noted the album occasionally features "rootsy" elements as well as "Hammond–style organs" and "faint violins". The album's opening song, "Here With Us", had been described as a rock song. In the Encyclopedia of Contemporary Christian Music, Mark Allan Powell described "Happy Little Love Song" as being a "Pearl Jam–type anthem fit for arenas". Powell also described "Hearts Sing Louder" as being influenced by Smash Mouth, and felt "It's My Joy" had a "bluesy rhythm" with "70s organs"; the song also samples "Joyful, Joyful We Adore You".

== Release, reception, and impact ==
The Worship Project was released on October 14, 1999. The band also issued The Worship Project Kit, which included the album as well a devotional and the words and chords to the songs. The album was sold through the Internet as well as bookstore signings. Copies of the album were produced by the band in their garage. Like most independent albums, The Worship Project did not appear on any record charts and met with limited fanfare. In the October 1, 2000 edition of Cross Rhythms, Mike Rimmer gave the album seven out of ten stars. Rimmer praised the album as being "miles better" than most major–label worship albums, but felt that "there’s still something missing in the overall approach". Rimmer said the album was a "good effort" but "falls short of being amazing". Sales for The Worship Project far exceeded sales of the band's previous records – according to Millard, whereas their previous albums would be lucky to sell 1,000 copies in a year, The Worship Project sold over 60,000 copies within a year. Millard estimated the album's overall sales at 100,000 – other sources peg the album's sales as of 2006 at 60,000 or 65,000 copies.

The difficulty of selling the album directly, in addition to having to book and manage for themselves, led the band to pursue a contract with a record label. The band would release one more album, 2000's Look, before signing with INO Records and releasing their 2001 album Almost There. Two songs from The Worship Project were re–recorded and included on Almost There – "I Can Only Imagine" and "Cannot Say Enough". "I Can Only Imagine" was released as the album's second single and became the band's breakthrough hit, topping the US Christian radio charts and receiving a GMA Dove Award for "Song of the Year" before becoming a hit on US mainstream radio in 2003. It became the first single by any artist in the Christian music genre to be certified platinum and was certified triple platinum in June 2018. It has sold 2.5 million copies as of March 2018, making it the best-selling Christian single of all time. Another song from The Worship Project, "Hearts Sing Louder", was included on the band's 2011 Family Christian Stores–exclusive album The Worship Sessions.

== Personnel ==
(Credits from the album liner notes)

MercyMe

- Bart Millard – lead vocals
- Mike Scheuchzer – guitar, background vocals
- Jim Bryson – keys
- Robby Shaffer – drums
- Nathan Cochran – bass guitar, background vocals

Technical/Misc.

- Jim Bryson – engineering, mixing
- MercyMe – producer
- Eric Wolf – mastering
- Shatrine Weik – design

== Track listing ==
Credits and track list from the album liner notes.

Track list
No.	Title	Lyrics	Music	Length
1.	"Here For You"	Bart Millard	MercyMe	3:54
2.	"Happy Little Love Song"	Millard	MercyMe	4:41
3.	"It's My Joy"	Millard	MercyMe	3:38
4.	"Say Amen"	Millard	MercyMe	5:09
5.	"I Can Only Imagine"	Millard	MercyMe	4:09
6.	"Cannot Say Enough"	Millard	MercyMe	4:19
7.	"Hearts Sing Louder"	Millard	MercyMe	5:00
8.	"Psalm 104"	Millard	MercyMe	3:02
9.	"Jesus Come Quickly"	Millard	MercyMe	4:07
10.	"Beautiful"	Nathan Cochran	Cochran	10:19

After the song "Beautiful" concludes, there is a hidden track: an acoustic version of "I Can Only Imagine"
