= Word of God Speak =

Single by MercyMe

from the album Spoken For
- A-side: "I Can Only Imagine"
- Released: September 23, 2003
- Recorded: 2002 in the United States
- Length: 3:07
- Label: INO; Curb
- Songwriters: Bart Millard; Pete Kipley
- Producer: Pete Kipley

MercyMe singles chronology
"Spoken For" (2002)	"Word of God Speak" (2003)	"The Change Inside Of Me" (2003)

"Word of God Speak" is a song by Christian rock band MercyMe. Written by Bart Millard and Pete Kipley, "Word of God Speak" uses sparse instrumentation, featuring only piano and strings to accompany Millard's vocals. The lyrics to "Word of God Speak" reflect on the idea that it is impossible to speak of an infinite God with a limited vocabulary.

Released as the second single from MercyMe's 2002 album Spoken For, Billboard magazine ranked the song at the top spot on their 2000s decade-end Christian Songs and Hot Christian AC charts. "Word of God Speak" spent 23 weeks atop the Billboard Christian Songs chart, the fifth longest running record for that chart; it spent a total of 76 weeks on that chart altogether. It also topped the Billboard Hot Christian AC chart and the Radio & Records Christian AC and INSPO charts, and peaked at No. 25 on the Christian CHR chart. "Word of God Speak" also won the Dove Awards for Song of the Year and Pop/Contemporary Song of the Year at the 35th GMA Dove Awards. It was certified platinum by the RIAA in 2026.

== Background ==
MercyMe's lead singer Bart Millard wrote "Word of God Speak" while touring in support of their single "I Can Only Imagine". The travel was exhausting, and Millard commented in an interview that, on one of the nights on tour, he "went to bed just really frustrated... It started feeling like everything I was saying was the same. I just thought, I have nothing else to say. So I went to bed with that on my mind". After falling asleep, Millard woke up early in the morning and wrote several lines to the song in his journal before going back to sleep. Several weeks later, he was searching through his journal and found the notes again; when he went to the band's studio, he showed the notes to his producer, Pete Kipley. The two finished the lyrics to the song in less than thirty minutes, and recorded the piano track the same night; they also brought in someone to compose a string track for the song. Millard wanted "Word of God Speak" to contain only piano, avoiding the big production that could assure the song success on the radio, as he felt the simple production would mirror the lyrics.

"Word of God Speak" was written by Bart Millard and Pete Kipley; it was also produced by Kipley. It was recorded at several locations; Luminous Sound in Dallas, Texas, The Sound Kitchen in Franklin, Tennessee, Indigo Room in Franklin, Tennessee, HydeAway Sound Lab in Jeckyll Island, Georgia, The Scwoodio in Greenville, Texas, Mountain View Recorders in Glorieta, New Mexico, and Playground Recording in Wylie, Texas. It was mastered by Richard Dodd at Vital Recordings, and mixed by Salvo at Salvo Mix.

== Composition ==
"Word of God Speak"
A 19-second audio sample of the song's chorus. The song's arrangement was noted to be "simple", featuring only piano, vocals, and strings.

"Word of God Speak" is a contemporary Christian song with a length of three minutes and seven seconds. It is set in the key of C major and has a tempo of 69 beats per minute, with Millard's vocal range spanning from C_{4}-F_{5}.

The music to "Word of God Speak" is stripped down, featuring piano and vocals; a string track is also present. The simple production was intended to mirror the lyrics of the song, which reflect on the concept that it is impossible to speak of an infinite God with the limited vocabulary of humanity. A critic, Russ Breimier, also noted the song reminds that "prayer and worship are not flowery orations".

== Critical reception ==
On his review of Spoken For, Russ Breimeier commented that "I particularly liked the brief "Word of God Speak," which simply reminds us that prayer and worship aren't about flowery orations... This song is to prayer what "Heart of Worship" is to worship".

"Word of God Speak" won the awards for Song of the Year and Pop/Contemporary Song of the Year at the 35th GMA Dove Awards.

== Chart performance ==
"Word of God Speak" peaked at number one on the Billboard Christian Songs chart, and spent 23 weeks at the top of the chart, and a total of 76 weeks on the chart. On the Billboard Hot Christian AC chart, the song spent 21 weeks atop the chart, and spent 61 weeks on it in total. On the Radio & Records Christian AC chart, "Word of God Speak" spent 10 weeks at the top, and stayed on the chart for 46 weeks in total; on the Radio & Records INSPO chart, the song spent nine weeks atop the chart, and spent 21 weeks on it in total. Additionally, the song peaked at No. 25 on the Radio & Records Christian CHR chart, and spent 12 weeks on that chart in total.

"Word of God Speak" ranked at No. 5 on the 2004 year-end Billboard Hot Christian Singles & Tracks Titles chart, and at No. 9 on the 2004 year-end Billboard Hot Christian Adult Contemporary Titles chart. It ranked at No. 1 on both the 2000s decade-end Christian Songs chart and the 2000s decade-end Hot Christian AC chart. It was later certified Platinum by RIAA in 2026.

== Cover versions ==
"Word of God Speak" has been covered by several artists. In 2005, actress Kristin Chenoweth covered the song on her album As I Am, and Christian rock band Kutless recorded a version of the song on their 2005 album Strong Tower. In 2004, contemporary Christian band Big Daddy Weave recorded a version of the song that was included on the compilation album WOW Worship: Red.

== Track listing ==
CD release

1. "I Can Only Imagine" – 4:08 (Bart Millard)
2. "Word of God Speak" – 3:07 (Peter Kipley, Millard)

== Personnel ==
Credits adapted from the album liner notes. (Note: The band members' instruments are not credited on the album's liner notes, aside from Bryson's role in recording. As only piano and strings are present in the song, only Bryson and Millard's de facto roles in the group are credited.)

MercyMe

- Bart Millard – lead vocals
- Jim Bryson – keys, recording

Additional performers

- Roy G. Biv String Vibe - strings

Production

- Csaba Petozz - recording
- J. R. McNeely - recording
- Lee Bridges - recording
- Richard Dodd - mastering
- Salvo - mixing

== Charts ==
=== Weekly charts ===
Weekly chart performance for "Word of God Speak"
Chart (2003)	Peak position
US Christian AC Airplay (Billboard)	1
US Christian AC Airplay (R&R)	1
US Christian CHR (R&R)	25
US Christian Inspo (R&R)	1
US Hot Christian Songs (Billboard)	1

=== Year-end charts ===
Year-end chart performance for "Word of God Speak"
Chart (2003)	Position
US Christian AC Airplay (Billboard)	1
US Hot Christian Songs (Billboard)	1
Chart (2004)	Position
US Christian AC Airplay (Billboard)	9
US Hot Christian Songs (Billboard)	5

=== Decade-end charts ===
Decade-end chart performance for "Word of God Speak"
Chart (2000s)	Position
US Christian AC Airplay (Billboard)	1
US Hot Christian Songs (Billboard)	1

== Certifications ==
Region	Certification	Certified units/sales
United States (RIAA)	Platinum	1,000,000^{‡}
^{‡} Sales+streaming figures based on certification alone.
