= Bless Me Indeed (Jabez's Song) =

2001 song by MercyMe

Single by MercyMe

from the album Almost There
- Released: 2001
- Recorded: Ivy Park, The Indigo Room, Paradise Sound, IBC Studios
- Genre: Christian rock
- Length: 4:14
- Label: INO records
- Songwriters: Jim Bryson, Nathan Cochran, Bart Millard, Mike Scheuchzer, Robby Shaffer
- Producer: Pete Kipley

MercyMe singles chronology
| "Bless Me Indeed (Jabez's Song)" (2001) | "I Can Only Imagine" (2001) |

"Bless Me Indeed (Jabez's Song)" is a song by Christian rock band MercyMe. Written by the band and produced by Pete Kipley, it was released as the lead single from the band's 2001 album Almost There. The song was written at the request of the band's record label, who wanted to produce a song based on the popular book The Prayer of Jabez (2000). Although the band did not want to write it at first, they eventually relented and recorded it.

Lyrically, "Bless Me Indeed" asks God for blessing, paralleling Jabez's prayer in 1 Chronicles. It received a mixed to positive response from critics; lead singer Bart Millard has since described it as one of the band's worst songs. The song did not perform well at Christian radio, peaking at number 27 on the Radio & Records Christian AC chart, leading to initial album sales that were lower than expected.

== Background and composition ==
The idea behind "Bless Me Indeed (Jabez's Song)" came from MercyMe's record label, INO Records, who wanted to capitalize off the success of Bruce Wilkinson's popular book The Prayer of Jabez (2000). According to lead singer Bart Millard, the label figured that the book could introduce the band and set up a successful career. Although the band did not want to write the song, they eventually relented. "Bless Me Indeed (Jabez's Song)" was written by Jim Bryson, Nathan Cochran, Bart Millard, Mike Scheuchzer, and Robby Shaffer - all five members of MercyMe at the time. Like the rest of Almost There, it was recorded at Ivy Park, The Indigo Room, Paradise Sound, and IBC Studios. Kipley produced and programmed the song, while Skye McCaskey and Julian Kindred engineered it. Salvo mixed the song. String instruments were recorded by the Paltrow Performance Group.

Bless Me Indeed (Jabez's Song)
An audio sample of "Bless Me Indeed (Jabez's Song)".

"Bless Me Indeed (Jabez's Song)" has a length of four minutes and fourteen seconds. According to the sheet music published by Musicnotes.com, it is in set common time in the key of C major and has a tempo of 108 beats per minute. Bart Millard's vocal range in the song spans from the low note of G♯_{4} to the high note of F♯_{5}. The song lyrically relates to the Biblical figure Jabez. In 1 Chronicles 4:10, Jabez requests that God bless him by expanding his territory and keeping him free from evil, a request God accepts. In "Bless Me Indeed (Jabez's Song)", Millard requests the same from God.

== Reception ==
"Bless Me Indeed" received a mixed to positive response from critics. Steve Losey of AllMusic selected it as a 'track pick'. The J Man of Crosswalk.com described it as a "winner", and appreciated that it was based on The Prayer of Jabez. However, Russ Breimeier of Christianity Today described the song as "[not] particularly remarkable", preferring another song based on Jabez, According to John's "Song of Jabez". In an interview in 2014, Millard stated that it is one of "one of the worst songs we’ve ever done".

== Chart performance ==
"Bless Me Indeed" was released as the first single from Almost There. Although the label anticipated the song's connection with The Prayer of Jaebz would make it a success, it performed poorly on Christian radio. The song debuted at number 29 on the Radio & Records Christian AC chart for the week of August 31, 2001. The following week, it advanced to its peak of number 27. The song spent four weeks on the chart before dropping off. The poor performance of the song at radio led to initial album sales that were lower than anticipated, although the album would later be certified triple platinum by the Recording Industry Association of America (RIAA) following the success of the album's second single, "I Can Only Imagine".

== Credits and personnel ==
Credits from the album liner notes.

MercyMe

- Bart Millard – lead vocals
- Mike Scheuchzer – guitars
- Jim Bryson – keys
- Nathan Cochran – bass guitar, background vocals
- Robby Shaffer – drums

Additional performers

- Paltrow Performance Group – strings

Technical/Misc.

- Peter Kipley – producer, programmer
- Steve McCaskey – engineer
- Julian Kindred – engineer
- Salvo – mixing
- Shane Wilson – mixing
- Elizabeth Workman – design
- Shawn Sanders – band photos

== Charts ==
| Chart (2001) | Peak position |
|---|---|
| US Christian Adult Contemporary (R&R) | 27 |
