= Welcome to the New =

Studio album by MercyMe
- Released: April 8, 2014
- Studios: Fab Music, Franklin, Tennessee; The Glove Box, Nashville, Tennessee; The House of Blues, Nashville, Tennessee; Dark Horse Recording Studio, Franklin, Tennessee
- Genres: Contemporary Christian music, worship, pop rock
- Length: 37:31
- Label: Fair Trade/Columbia
- Producers: David Garcia; Ben Glover

MercyMe chronology
The Hurt & The Healer (2012)	Welcome to the New (2014)	MercyMe, It's Christmas! (2015)

Singles from Welcome to the New
- 1. "Shake" Released: November 12, 2013; 2. "Greater" Released: June 20, 2014; 3. "Flawless" Released: April 17, 2015; 4. "Dear Younger Me" Released: May 20, 2016

Welcome to the New is the eighth studio album from contemporary Christian music band MercyMe, which was released on April 8, 2014, by Fair Trade Services and Columbia Records, and the producers are David Garcia and Ben Glover.

It debuted at No. 1 on the Billboard Christian Album chart, No. 1 and No. 4 on the Billboard 200 chart, selling 26,000 copies in its first week. The lead single from the album is "Shake", which has peaked at No. 6 on the Billboard Christian Songs chart for the charting week of April 12, 2014, and the second single from the release is "Greater" that peaked at No. 2 on the same chart for the charting week of September 6, 2014.

== Background and recording ==
The album Welcome to the New released on April 8, 2014, by Fair Trade Services and Columbia Records. The producers of the album are David Garcia and Ben Glover. The material for the album was recorded in 2013 and 2014 in various studios in and around Music City, and those studios are as follows; Fab Music in Franklin, Tennessee, The Glove Box Nashville, Tennessee, The House of Blues in Nashville and Dark Horse Studios in Franklin.

== Composition and musical style ==
The music on Welcome to the New has been described as jazz in parts, to having a rock and dance music flair of the 1970s and 80s, and sound like they have been influenced by The Black Keys. This album features some rhythm and blues, urban contemporary gospel, Christian country, and Irish folk that was inspired by touring with Rend Collective.

"Welcome to the New" is an upbeat light pop song with elements of synth rock, and contains some jazz parts, which has the electric guitar guiding the song with other instruments of forceful drums and guitar riffs. In addition, it is a delectable track "with its bouncy, brassy, pop hook [that] will remind believers that Pharrell's 'Happy' is okay but we can get happiness-plus with joy." The next three tracks have been referred to as "electro-fueled rock and worship numbers". The song "Gotta Let It Go" is a song in the vein of Smash Mouth that contains a forceful modern rock essence to the beat. It has been referred to as "a fuzzed out retro rocker"., and some even suggest that the song harkens back to U2's music around the Achtung Baby period, which particularly like "The Fly".

"Shake" is the lead single and is an uptempo dancing-esque song, which has been referred to as Contemporary Christian, Rock Music, Adult Contemporary and Alternative Rock "Greater" is the second single from the album that is a Contemporary Christian, Worship Music and Pop rock track with Americana, folk and country elements and some acoustic elements, which has a "campfire sing-along" vibe, and this takes a cue from Rend Collective's music. The song "Finish What He Started" is a highly emotive song, which is a ballad that has resonate drums, weighty bass elementation and massive guitar hooks. "Flawless" is a piano centered ballad that features some synths and electronic music aspects.

The song "New Lease on Life" is a Southern rock song with some Gospel overtones, and has been referred to as a positive bluesy song, with a "dirty blues riff", that is a garage rock type of song, which has a commercial appeal. "Wishful Thinking" is a soulful song, with some "haunting saxophone riffs" to the ballad, and even features a church type organ. The song "Burn Baby Burn" is a synth-based alternative rock anthem. "Dear Younger Me" is described as being autobiographical to Bart Millard's life that is highly emotive.

== Release and promotion ==
The album was promoted by the release of the lead single, "Shake", on November 12, 2013, that peaked at No. 9 on the Christian Airplay charts, No. 2 on the Christian Digital Songs chart, No. 6 on the Christian Songs chart, No. 8 on the Christian AC Songs chart, No. 14 on the Christian AC/CHR chart, No. 3 on the Christian AC Indicator. The second single, "Greater", was released on March 25, 2014, in promotion of the album's release, and spent 16 weeks at No. 1 on the Christian Airplay chart, and peaked at No. 2 on both the Christian Digital Songs chart and the Christian Songs chart. The third single, "Flawless", was released on April 21, 2015, and also peaked at No. 2 on the Christian Songs chart and No. 1 on the Christian Airplay Chart.

== Critical reception ==
Professional ratings
Review scores
Source	Rating
AllMusic	4/5 stars
CCM Magazine	4/5 stars
CM Addict	4.5/5 stars
Cross Rhythms	10/10 squares
Indie Vision Music	5/5 stars
Jesus Freak Hideout	3.5/5 stars
New Release Tuesday	4.5/5 stars
The Sound Opinion	5/5 stars
USA Today	3/4 stars
Worship Leader	4.5/5 stars

Welcome to the New met with positive reception from music critics. Most reviewers have taken a liking to the multitude of stylistic shifts in the album, however one was not enthused with them because of the incomplete and unrefined nature to the music. Another reviewer said that some listeners might not be able to understand the music throughout the varying stylistic shifts. At AllMusic, David Jeffries rated the album four stars out of five, and according to him it is "Right-sized at ten songs with no filler to speak of, Welcome to the New is another entry in the band's long list of triumphs."

At USA Today, Brian Mansfield rated the album three stars out of four, remarking that "Here, renewal and spiritual transformation actually sound fun." Grace S. Aspinwall of CCM Magazine rated the album four stars out of five, calling it "Their finest work to date." At Worship Leader, Jay Akins rated the album four-and-a-half stars, observing how "Welcome to the New is a party from top to bottom" that "brings newness to a new level." Tony Cummings at Cross Rhythms rated the album a perfect ten squares, stating that the release "sounds like a band released from the industry expectations of jumping through limited stylistic hoops", and to this he has "no doubt that this is their best ever album."

At New Release Tuesday, Sarah Fine rated the album four-and-a-half stars out of five, saying that "It's more like 12 steps and a giant leap" forwards. Jonathan Andre of Indie Vision Music rated the album a perfect five stars, proclaiming that "With plenty of rock songs to please the alternative genre, Welcome to the New stretches musical boundaries to boldly assert its authority as one of this year’s standout albums." Christian Music Review's Laura Chambers rated the album four point two out of five, noting how that "As a themed album, Welcome To The New sticks to the same topic very well, exploring it at different angles." At CM Addict, Julia Kitzing rated the album four-and-a-half stars out of five, writing that "It’s catchy and fun, with a wonderful message of hope woven throughout."

Joshua Andre of Christian Music Zine rated the album four-and-a-half out of five stars, stating that the band "have crafted a fine effort" with Welcome to the New. At Hallels, Timothy Yap gave a positive review, praising the song "Dear Younger Me", when he stated the album is worth it just because of that gem of a track. In addition, Yap states that "MercyMe puts the Christ back into Christianity", which "when Christ is central, this is where the party begins." Louder Than the Music's Jono Davies rated the album four-and-a-half stars out of five, remarking that "There is a true freshness to this album". At The Sound Opinion, Lindsay Williams rated the album a perfect five stars, noting that "Welcome to the New is musically ambitious, lyrically sound and one of MercyMe's best records yet." Tom Frigoli of Alpha Omega News graded the album a B+, calling the release "fun, exciting, and fresh".

At Jesus Freak Hideout, Mark Rice rated the album three-and-a-half stars out of five, cautioning that "Without a doubt, Welcome To The New is worth a try for any fan of Christian music, and while many will be put off by it, many more will love it." Piet Levy of the Milwaukee Journal Sentinel gave a mixed review on the album, criticizing them because they are "hardly Christian rock's answer to the Black Keys", and the release in that "Lyrically, MercyMe doesn't offer anything much more complex than its uplifting 'God is great' messaging, but that approach doesn't provide much incentive for non-fans to seek out 'Welcome to the New.'"

Welcome to the New and its lead single, "Shake", were nominated for Best Contemporary Christian Music Album and Best Contemporary Christian Music Performance/Song respectively at the 57th Annual Grammy Awards.

== Commercial performance ==
For the Billboard charting week of April 26, 2014, Welcome to the New was the No. 4 most sold album in the entirety of the United States by the Billboard 200, and it was the No. 1 most sold Top Christian Album. The album sold 26,000 copies in its first week. As of January 2015, the album has sold 178,000 copies.

== Track listing ==
No.	Title	Writer(s)	Length
1.	"Welcome to the New"	MercyMe, David Garcia, Ben Glover, Solomon Olds	3:19
2.	"Gotta Let It Go"	MercyMe, Garcia, Glover, Olds	2:58
3.	"Shake"	MercyMe, Garcia, Glover, Olds	3:13
4.	"Greater"	MercyMe, Garcia, Glover	4:07
5.	"Finish What He Started"	MercyMe, Garcia, Glover	4:28
6.	"Flawless"	MercyMe, Garcia, Glover, Olds	4:15
7.	"New Lease on Life"	MercyMe, Garcia, Glover, Olds	3:02
8.	"Wishful Thinking"	MercyMe, Garcia, Glover	4:52
9.	"Burn Baby Burn"	MercyMe, Garcia, Glover, Olds	3:51
10.	"Dear Younger Me"	MercyMe, Garcia, Glover	3:26
Total length:			37:31

== Personnel ==
These credits are modified taken from AllMusic.

MercyMe

- Bart Millard – vocals, gang vocals (1, 2, 4, 6, 9)
- Barry Graul – guitars, gang vocals (2)
- Mike Scheuchzer – guitars, SPB (1), gang vocals (2)
- Nathan Cochran – bass, gang vocals (2)
- Robby Shaffer – drums, gang vocals (2)

Additional musicians

- Ben Glover – acoustic piano, guitars, keyboards (1, 6, 9), programming (1, 6, 9), gang vocals (1, 6, 9)
- Solomon Olds – keyboards (1, 3, 6), programming (1, 3, 6)
- Fred Williams – keyboards (1, 4, 5), programming (1, 4, 5)
- David Garcia – Hammond B3 organ, guitars, keyboards (2–5), programming (2–5), gang vocals (4)
- Joe Thibodeau – keyboards (6), programming (6)
- Matt Stanfield – keyboards (9), programming (9)
- Chris Lacorte – guitars (1)
- Jerry McPherson – guitars (1)
- Russ Pahl – pedal steel guitar
- Mark Hill – bass (1)
- Darrell Leonard – brass (7)
- Eamon McLoughlin – fiddle
- Elijah's Heart Ministries – kids choir (8)
- Charlie Millard – kids choir (8)
- Gracie Millard – kids choir (8)
- Sophie Millard – kids choir (8)

Production

- Ben Glover – producer, engineer (1, 3, 5, 6, 9)
- David Garcia – producer, engineer (2–5, 7, 8, 10)
- Chris Wilkinson – engineer (1, 2, 5, 6, 8, 9)
- Joe Martino – engineer (7, 10)
- Bobby Campbell – additional editing (1, 6, 9)
- Mike "X" O'Conner – additional editing (1–7, 9, 10)
- Ben Phillips – additional editing (1), engineer (3)
- Neal Avron – mixing (1, 6, 9)
- Mark Endert – mixing (2–5, 8, 10)
- Logan Dickerson – design
- Brody Harper – art direction
- Dana Salsedo – art direction
- David Molnar – photography
- Anna Redmon – stylist
- Tricia Baumhardt – hair, make-up

== Chart performance ==
=== Weekly charts ===
Chart (2014)	Peak position
US Billboard 200	4
US Top Christian Albums (Billboard)	1
US Digital Albums (Billboard)	4

=== Year-end charts ===
Chart (2014)	Position
US Billboard 200	145
US Christian Albums (Billboard)	4
Chart (2015)	Position
US Christian Albums (Billboard)	4
Chart (2016)	Position
US Christian Albums (Billboard)	19
Chart (2017)	Position
US Christian Albums (Billboard)	23

=== Singles ===
Year	Single	Peak chart positions	
Year	Single	US Christian	US Christian Airplay
2014	"Shake"	6	9
2014	"Greater"	2	1
2015	"Flawless"	2	1

== Certifications ==
Region	Certification	Certified units/sales
United States (RIAA)	Gold	500,000^{‡}
^{‡} Sales+streaming figures based on certification alone.
