= The Hurt & the Healer =

Studio album by MercyMe
- Released: May 22, 2012
- Recorded: 2011–2012
- Studios: Echo Mountain Studios, Asheville, North Carolina
- Genre: Contemporary Christian music
- Length: 39:04
- Labels: Fair Trade, Columbia
- Producers: Brown Bannister, Dan Muckala

MercyMe chronology
The Generous Mr. Lovewell (2010)	The Hurt & the Healer (2012)	Welcome to the New (2014)

Singles from The Hurt & the Healer
- 1. "The Hurt & the Healer" Released: February 3, 2012; 2. "You Are I Am" Released: September 7, 2012

The Hurt & the Healer is the seventh studio album by American contemporary Christian music band MercyMe. Released on May 22, 2012, the album was about the season that the band is currently in at the time of composing the music. Produced by Brown Bannister and Dan Muckala, the album met with positive critical and commercial reception. The album sold over 33,000 copies its first week and debuted at No. 7 on the Billboard 200 and at No. 1 on the Christian Albums chart. This is also their first album release without keyboardist and group co-founder Jim Bryson.

The first single released from the album is the song "The Hurt & the Healer". This song reached No. 1 on the Christian Songs and AC Indicator and Soft AC/Inspirational charts, No. 2 on the Hot Christian Adult Contemporary chart, and No. 11 on the Christian CHR chart. The second single "You Are I Am" reached No. 3 on the Christian Songs chart.

== Background ==
=== Concept ===
In the past, MercyMe and Millard have made songs "based on what people wanted to hear me say. 'Bring the Rain' is a great example. It sounds like I've got it all together, but it's where I wanted to be; not where I was. This past year, I've definitely had those moments where I found myself asking God, 'You are still in control, right?'" This was because the loss of his cousin, who was a firefighter that was killed in the line of duty. So, this album was written from this trying season in Millard's and MercyMe's life, which Millard described as "one of the most disturbing and proud moments of my life." This was because Millard is a person that is a "guy who has all the questions to the guy who is asked all the questions."

The album was written from the perspective of "telling people they're beautiful in the eyes of Christ". In addition, Millard said that they are "reminding people that their identity is in Christ...not their guilt or shame, that they're not a bad person trying to be good...they're redeemed, sanctified." Millard denotes with respect to this album that "sin is powerless and can't remove us from the hand of God. I've had to go through the fact that I set up my dad in sainthood, but never addressed the years of abuse. I am not my shame. I'm not my guilt. Christ is not getting back on the cross. It's finished once and for all. For the first time, after years of being in the church, I feel like I'm seeing a part of God and myself. This is the first time I'm really living it. I am worthy. It's been a big shift for me. I'm done telling people to stop sinning and, instead, let them know who they are in Christ."

=== Recorded ===
This album was recorded in 2011–12 at the Echo Mountain Studios in Asheville, North Carolina.

== Composition ==
=== Music ===
The music on the record is one of telling each and everyone of us who we are in Christ, and we need to claim it. Furthermore, we need not deny the Cross because it is done once and for all-time sake.

=== Lyrics ===
The lyrics for the song "The Hurt & the Healer" come from the death of Millard's cousin in the line of duty and it represents the season the band is going through right now. In addition, the song is the trend setter for the rest of the record because it gives the album its essential theme.

The lyrics to the song "You Are I Am" come from a longing of asking "God, 'You are still in control, right?'" To this, the song says "You're the one who conquers giants/ you're the one who calls out kings/ you shut the mouths of lions/ you tell the dead to breathe".

== Singles ==
The first radio single was "The Hurt & the Healer". This song has been reached No. 1 on the Christian AC Indicator and Soft AC/Inspirational charts, No. 2 on the Hot Christian Adult Contemporary chart, Christian Songs chart at No. 3 and No. 11 on the Christian CHR chart.

== Book ==
This August 2013, a book inspired by "The Hurt & the Healer" was released by Baker Books. The book was co-authored by Bart Millard and Andrew Farley, best-selling author of The Naked Gospel and God Without Religion.

== Critical reception ==
Professional ratings
Review scores
Source	Rating
AllMusic	4/5 stars
CCM Magazine	3/5 stars
Christian Broadcasting Network	3/5 spins
Christian Music Zine	4.5/5 stars
Christianity Today	3/5 stars
Cross Rhythms	10/10 squares
Indie Vision Music	4/5 stars
Jesus Freak Hideout	3.5/5 stars
Louder Than the Music	4/5 stars
New Release Tuesday	5/5 stars
The Phantom Tollbooth	3.5/5 stars
Worship Leader	3/5 stars

The Hurt & the Healer received generally positive reception from twelve music critics. James Christopher Monger of Allmusic's rated the album four stars, saying that the album "may not deviate much from the fairly predictable, anthem-heavy template of previous outings, but few bands in the genre are as adept as MercyMe when it comes to implementing that sound effectively." At CCM Magazine, Grace S. Aspinwall rated the album three stars, writing that "while they could have reached even further lyrically, this is their best project to date." In addition, Aspinwall wrote "but this latest album shows that the band continues to push itself to greatness."

Todd Jennings of Christian Broadcasting Network rated the album three stars, noting that "The album contains 10 catchy, well-written songs—each could have potential for radio play", however "unfortunately, the album also comes across a little over-produced (do we really need more auto-tuning?) and too polished. All of the songs sound great, but lack the raw feel that made some of their earlier work so relatable [sic]." At Christianity Today, Ron Augustine rated the album three stars, writing that "MercyMe is clearly a band intent on making music to and for God, and for that their work will never return void." Founder Tony Cummings of Cross Rhythms rated the album a perfect ten squares, saying that "undoubtedly, 'The Hurt & the Healer' is one of the standout albums of the year and everyone, including producers Brown Bannister and Dan Muckala, should be proud of having created such an uplifting, and potentially heart-changing, set of songs."

At Worship Leader, Jeremy Armstrong rated the album three stars, stating that because of the darker tone to the music it "costs more memorable hooks in the up-tempo tunes." Jonathan Andre of Indie Vision Music rated the album four stars, noting that "MercyMe have created one of their most mature and lyrically profound of their career, with much musical experimentation to show that the album is one of the rockiest they have ever done" on which "stretches musical boundaries to boldly assert its authority as one of this year’s standout albums." At Jesus Freak Hideout, Alex "Tincan" Caldwell rated the album three-and-a-half stars, stating that "firmly in their second decade as a band, MercyMe is in dire need of breaking out of the Adult Contemporary mold, and The Hurt & the Healer shows signs that they might be on their way, however slowly, to a more diverse and creative future as an artist."

Kevin Davis of New Release Tuesday rated the album a perfect five stars, saying that the album "each album has improved upon their previous excellent offering". At The Phantom Tollbooth, Michael Dalton rated the album three-and-a-half stars, writing that Bart Millard is "in fine form but he also gets an excellent assist from group background vocals scattered throughout", which he likes how the production is "slightly raw, [and] uncluttered". Joshua Andre of Christian Music Zine rated the album four-and-a-half stars, noting that with what he has "experienced in this 40 minutes musical and lyrical journey across an expanse of genres from alternative rock to the humble piano ballad, I can truly say that MercyMe has matched their 2010 album 110%!" At Louder Than the Music, Jono Davies rated the album four stars, stating that "as this has so many strong tracks on the album that actually the bar has been set very high."

== Commercial performance ==
The album sold 33,000 copies the first week that it was released.

== Track listing ==
No.	Title	Writer(s)	Length
1.	"You Know Better"	Brown Bannister, MercyMe, Dan Muckala	3:26
2.	"You Don't Care at All"	MercyMe, Seth Mosley	3:05
3.	"The Hurt & the Healer"	MercyMe	4:50
4.	"To Whom it May Concern"	Jason Ingram, MercyMe	3:36
5.	"You Are I Am"	Ingram, MercyMe, Mosley, Muckala	4:20
6.	"Take the Time" (featuring Bear Rinehart of NEEDTOBREATHE)	MercyMe, Bear Rinehart	4:43
7.	"Don't Give Up on Me"	MercyMe, Muckala	3:55
8.	"Hold On"	Bannister, MercyMe, Muckala	3:55
9.	"Best of Me"	MercyMe, Mosley	3:28
10.	"The First Time"	Ingram, MercyMe, Muckala	3:46
Total length:			39:04

== Personnel ==
Credits are taken from the back of album's booklet

MercyMe

- Bart Millard – lead vocals, backing vocals
- Barry Graul – guitars, backing vocals
- Mike Scheuchzer – guitars, backing vocals
- Nathan Cochran – bass, backing vocals
- Robby Shaffer – drums

Additional musicians

- Dan Muckala – programming, keyboards, backing vocals
- Bear Rinehart – guest vocals on "Take the Time"

Production and Technical

- Brown Bannister – producer, overdub recording
- Dan Muckala – producer, overdub recording, digital editing
- F. Reid Shippen – recording, mixing
- Seth Bolt – vocal recording
- David Muckala – assistant engineer
- Dan Deurloo – drum editing, drum technician
- Erik "Keller" Jahner – mix assistant
- Ted Jensen – mastering
- Mixed at Robert Lemon (Nashville, Tennessee).
- Mastered at Sterling Sound (New York City, New York).

Artwork and Design

- Nate Farro – design
- Brody Harper – design, art direction
- David Molnar – photography
- Dana Salsedo – art direction

== Charts ==
Weekly charts
Chart (2012)	Peak position
US Billboard 200	7
US Top Christian Albums (Billboard)	1
US Digital Albums (Billboard)	13

Year-end
Chart (2012)	Position
Billboard Christian Albums	10
