= Greater (song) =

Single by MercyMe

from the album Welcome to the New
- Released: June 20, 2014
- Recorded: 2013–14
- Genre: CCM; worship; pop rock
- Length: 4:09 (album version); 4:15 (music video version); 3:43 (radio edit)
- Label: Fair Trade/Columbia
- Songwriters: Barry Graul; Bart Millard; Mike Scheuchzer; Nathan Cochran; Robby Shaffer; David Garcia; Ben Glover
- Producers: Garcia; Glover

MercyMe singles chronology
"Shake" (2013)	"Greater" (2014)	"Flawless" (2015)

Music video
- "Greater" on YouTube

"Greater" is the second single by contemporary Christian music band MercyMe for their eighth studio album, Welcome to the New (2014). It was released as a single on June 20, 2014. The song peaked at No. 2 on the US Hot Christian Songs chart, blocked from the top by "Oceans (Where Feet May Fail)" by Hillsong United. It was their record-extending twelfth Christian Airplay chart topper. It lasted 49 weeks on the overall chart. It also peaked at No. 14 on the Billboard Bubbling Under Hot 100. The song is played in a D major key, and 116 beats per minute.

The song also appears in the compilation album, WOW Hits 2016.

== Background ==
"Greater" was released on June 20, 2014 as the second single from their eighth studio album Welcome to the New. Bart Millard, the band's frontman, revealed the meaning of the song in an interview with NewReleaseToday, "My kids have memorized the album already. Nothing warms your heart more than to hear your kids sing this message. The thing with 'Greater' is that my middle son Charlie is a lot like me. In fact, I went through a lot of grief counseling these past few years. My grief counselor said if I ever want to know what I'm like when in a healthy family to watch Charlie. One day I was trying to tell my son, because he has a stuttering problem, we were talking, and I said, "Buddy, people may make fun of you, but you have something inside of you that is telling you that you're something different, that you're stronger than that and that you're beautiful. We were at church one day and some kids made of him and he was kind of down. I told him, 'You know what I've told you. That's not them. The enemy may be using them, but these kids are good. They're not coming after you, it's just the enemy is taking shots at you. He's taking shots at you because you're something special and he's afraid of something you may do. I've always told him to set his mind on things above, and he started singing this song, 'You are holy, righteous and redeemed.' I just started bawling. From time to time I can hear him singing this song in the house and I've thought that's the reason to make a record."

== Composition ==
"Greater" is an CCM, Worship and Pop rock track with Amerciana, folk and country elements and some acoustic elements, which has a "campfire sing-along" vibe, and this takes a cue from Rend Collective's music. It is originally in the key of D major, with a tempo of 116 beats per minute. Written in common time, Millard's vocal range spans from D_{3} to B_{4} during the song. Commercial performance

"Greater" spent 16 weeks at No. 1 on the Christian Airplay chart, and peaked at No. 2 on both the Christian Digital Songs chart and the Christian Songs chart. It also appeared on the Bubbling Under Hot 100 chart at No. 14 and Heatseekers Songs chart at No. 21.

== Track listing ==
CD release

1. "Greater"
2. "Greater (Vocal Demonstration)"
3. "Greater (High Key with Background Vocals)"
4. "Greater (High Key without Background Vocals)"
5. "Greater (Medium Key with Background Vocals)"
6. "Greater (Medium Key without Background Vocals)"
7. "Greater (Low Key with Background Vocals)"
8. "Greater (Low Key without Background Vocals)"

== Music video ==
The lyric video of "Greater" was published on YouTube on July 11, 2014. As of March 2019, the video has received more than 40 million views. The official music video of "Greater" was released on November 21, 2014, through YouTube.

== Charts ==
=== Weekly charts ===
Chart (2014–2015)	Peak position
US Bubbling Under Hot 100 (Billboard)	14
US Christian AC (Billboard)	1
US Christian Airplay (Billboard)	1
US Hot Christian Songs (Billboard)	2
US Christian AC Indicator (Billboard)	1
US Heatseekers Songs (Billboard)	21

=== Year-end charts ===
Chart (2014)	Peak position
US Christian AC (Billboard)	12
US Christian Airplay (Billboard)	12
US Christian Songs (Billboard)	6
Chart (2015)	Peak position
US Christian AC (Billboard)	7
US Christian Airplay (Billboard)	8
US Christian Songs (Billboard)	9

=== Decade-end charts ===
Chart (2010s)	Position
US Christian Songs (Billboard)	13

== Certifications ==
Region	Certification	Certified units/sales
United States (RIAA)	Gold	500,000^{‡}
^{‡} Sales+streaming figures based on certification alone.
