= Glorieta, New Mexico =

- CDP
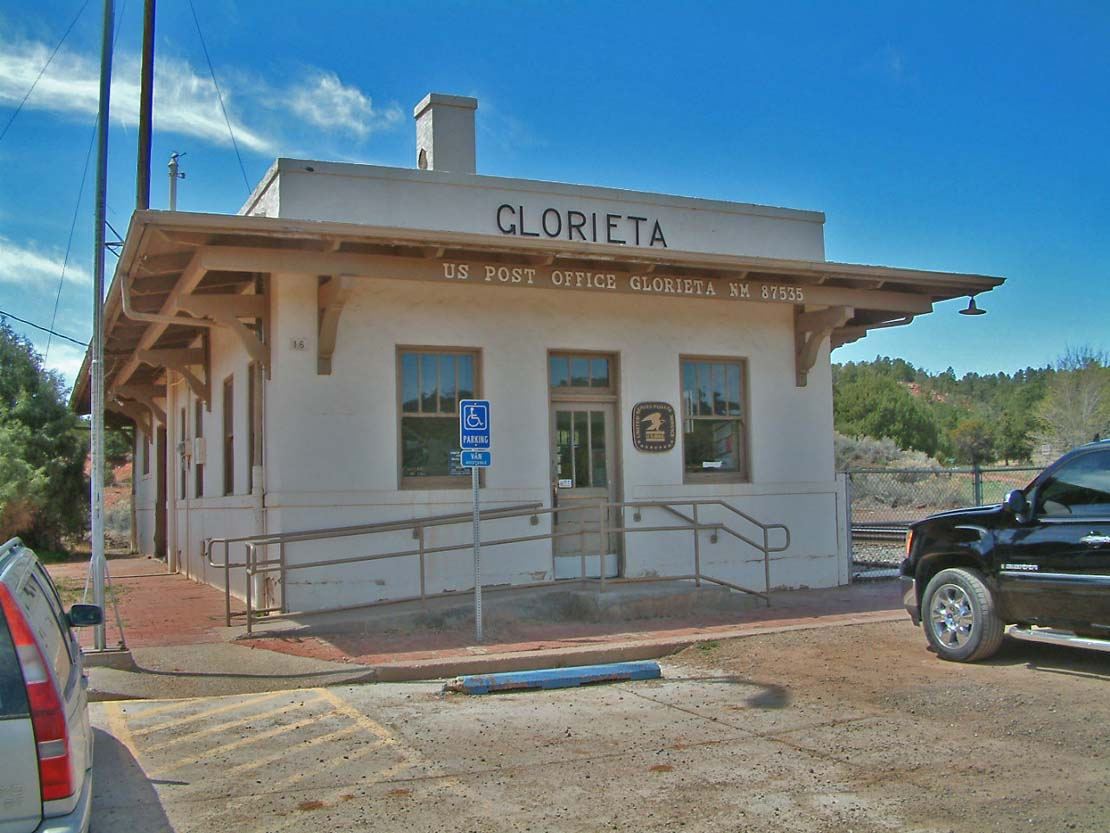
- Glorieta's former Santa Fe depot, now a post office.

- Location of Glorieta, New Mexico

- Location in the United States
- Coordinates: 35°34′40″N 105°45′25″W
- Country: United States
- State: New Mexico
- County: Santa Fe

Area
  - Total: 7.65 sq mi (19.81 km^{2})
  - Land: 7.65 sq mi (19.81 km^{2})
  - Water: 0 sq mi (0.00 km^{2})
- Elevation: 7,412 ft (2,259 m)

Population (2020)
  - Total: 511
  - Density: 66.8/sq mi (25.79/km^{2})
- Time zone: UTC-7 (Mountain (MST))
  - Summer (DST): UTC-6 (MDT)
- ZIP code: 87535
- Area code: 505
- FIPS code: 35-29860
- GNIS feature ID: 2408302

Glorieta is a census-designated place (CDP) in Santa Fe County, New Mexico, United States. It is part of the Albuquerque–Santa Fe–Las Vegas combined statistical area. As of the 2020 census, Glorieta had a population of 511. The community is located in the southern Sangre de Cristo Mountains, along Interstate 25 on the east side of Glorieta Pass.

== Etymology ==
The name "Glorieta", (Spanish: "bower" or "arbor"), is a common term in Mexico for a small square or gathering place surrounded by trees or vegetation.

== History ==
The area was the site of two battles in New Mexico history, the Capture of Santa Fe and the Battle of Glorieta Pass. The community was founded in 1879 with the arrival of the New Mexico and Southern Pacific Railroad, with a post office established in 1880.

== Geography ==
Glorieta is located along the former Atchison, Topeka and Santa Fe Railway (now the BNSF), with its former station at the summit of the rail line's route over Glorieta Pass. It was a stop along the record-breaking Scott Special passenger train in 1905. The rail line is still used by Amtrak's Southwest Chief, one train daily in each direction, but as of 2025 has very little freight traffic.

According to the United States Census Bureau, the CDP has a total area of 7.6 square miles (20 km^{2}), all land.

== Demographics ==
Historical population
Census	Pop.	Note	%±
2020	511		—
U.S. Decennial Census

As of the census of 2000, there were 859 people, 315 households, and 223 families residing in the CDP. The population density was 68.7 inhabitants per square mile (26.5/km^{2}). There were 339 housing units at an average density of 27.1 per square mile (10.5/km^{2}). The racial makeup of the CDP was 78.11% White, 0.23% African American, 2.10% Native American, 0.23% Asian, 15.83% from other races, and 3.49% from two or more races. Hispanic or Latino of any race were 56.00% of the population.

There were 315 households, out of which 34.0% had children under the age of 18 living with them, 52.4% were married couples living together, 13.0% had a female householder with no husband present, and 29.2% were non-families. 19.7% of all households were made up of individuals, and 2.2% had someone living alone who was 65 years of age or older. The average household size was 2.59 and the average family size was 3.00.

In the CDP, the population was spread out, with 25.7% under the age of 18, 5.6% from 18 to 24, 31.4% from 25 to 44, 28.3% from 45 to 64, and 9.0% who were 65 years of age or older. The median age was 38 years. For every 100 females, there were 97.5 males. For every 100 females age 18 and over, there were 96.9 males.

The median income for a household in the CDP was $36,250, and the median income for a family was $46,429. Males had a median income of $34,432 versus $31,625 for females. The per capita income for the CDP was $19,564. About 7.7% of families and 16.4% of the population were below the poverty line, including 13.3% of those under age 18 and none of those age 65 or over.

== Education ==
It is within Santa Fe Public Schools.

It is zoned to El Dorado Community School (K-8) in El Dorado. Its high school is Santa Fe High School.

== See also ==
- List of census-designated places in New Mexico
