= I Can Only Imagine (MercyMe song) =

2001 single by MercyMe

Single by MercyMe

from the album Almost There
- A-side: "Word of God Speak"
- Released: October 12, 2001 (radio); September 23, 2003 (CD single)
- Recorded: 1999
- Studio: Ivy Park; The Indigo Room; Paradise Sound; IBC Studios
- Genre: Contemporary Christian; pop
- Length: 4:08
- Label: INO/Curb
- Songwriter: Bart Millard
- Producer: Pete Kipley

MercyMe singles chronology
| "Bless Me Indeed (Jabez's Song)" (2001) | "I Can Only Imagine" (2001) | "Spoken For" (2002) |

"I Can Only Imagine" is a song by Christian rock band MercyMe. Written and composed by lead singer Bart Millard, it was originally recorded for the band's 1999 independent album The Worship Project before being included on their 2001 major-label debut album Almost There. The song was the last to be written for The Worship Project; in writing it, Millard drew upon his thoughts about his father's death. Lyrically, it imagines what it would be like to be in front of Jesus in heaven; it opens with only piano before building to include guitar and drums.

After being released on October 12, 2001, as the second single from Almost There, "I Can Only Imagine" became a major success on Christian radio; it spent two weeks at No. 1 on the Radio & Records Christian AC chart and became the most-played Christian single of 2002. It became an unexpected mainstream hit in 2003, peaking at No. 71 on the Billboard Hot 100 and No. 5 on the Billboard Adult Contemporary chart while also hitting top 40, adult top 40, and country radio charts. The song returned to the charts after its story was adapted into a 2018 film of the same name, peaking at No. 1 on the Billboard Christian Songs chart and No. 10 on the Billboard Digital Songs chart.

"I Can Only Imagine" received positive reviews from critics. Particular praise was given to its lyrics, and some critics called it the best song on Almost There. It received the Dove Awards for Song of the Year and Pop/Contemporary Recorded Song of the Year at the 33rd GMA Dove Awards, also garnering Millard the award for Songwriter of the Year; he also won the Songwriter of the Year award at the 25th American Society of Composers, Authors and Publishers (ASCAP) Christian Music Awards. In 2006, CCM Magazine ranked it as the fourth-best song in Christian music.

It is the most-played song in the history of Christian radio as well as the best-selling Christian song of all time. It has been certified five-times platinum by the Recording Industry Association of America (RIAA), and as of October 2025, it has sold over 5 million copies.

== Background and recording ==
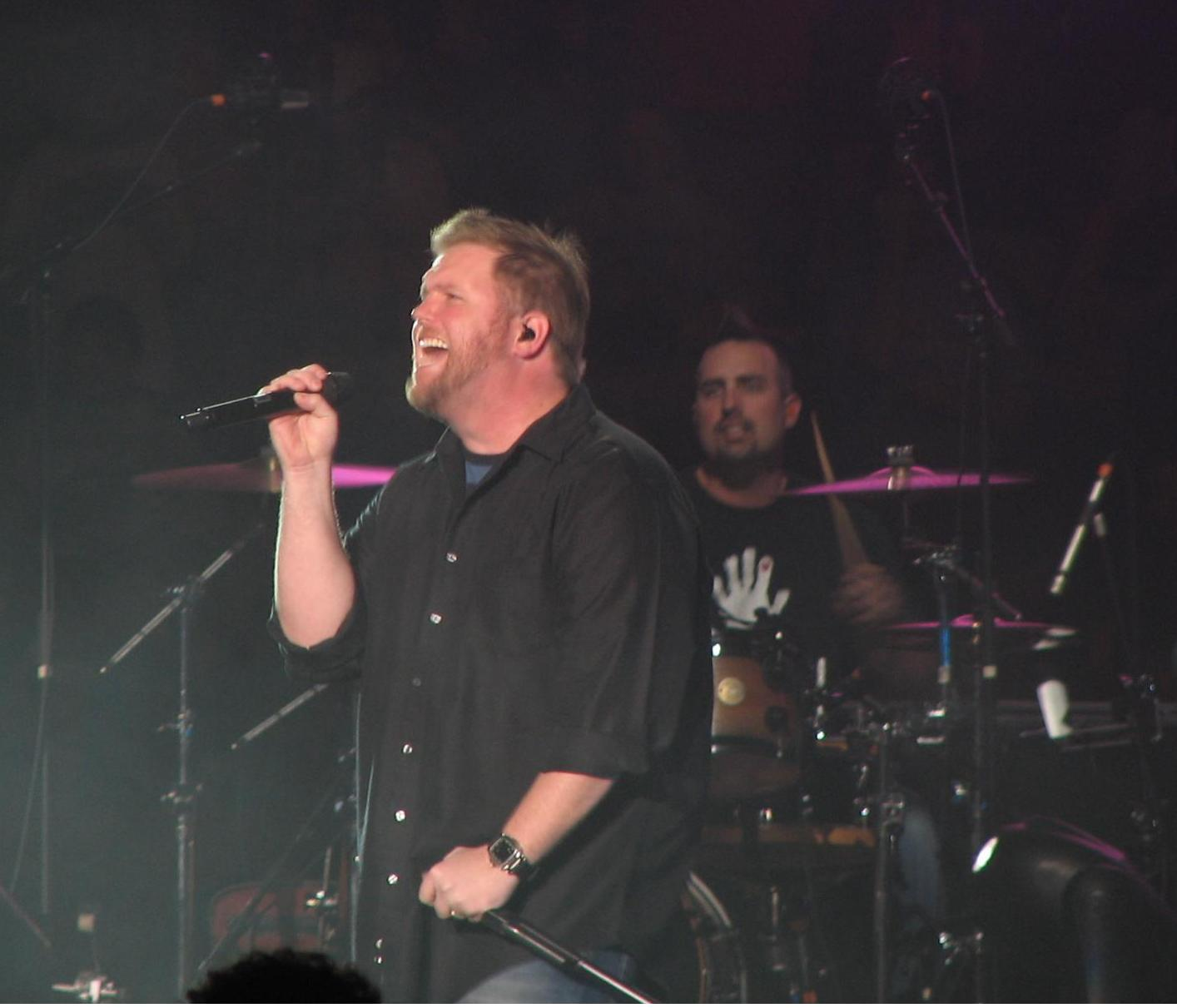
MercyMe's lead singer and songwriter, Bart Millard (left), is credited with writing or co-writing most of the songs on the album.

MercyMe was formed in 1994 by vocalist Bart Millard, guitarist Mike Scheuchzer, and keyboardist Jim Bryson. The band later brought on drummer Robby Shaffer and bassist Nathan Cochran. In their early years, they independently released four Christian alternative rock albums, drawing influence from the grunge style of rock music popular at the time. However, they realized that their original songs from these albums failed to connect with their audiences while their covers of popular worship songs were much more popular. Because of this, the band decided to write and produce an album of original worship songs. This album, The Worship Project, utilized a simple verse–chorus format designed to easily fit on a PowerPoint screen.

In the last phases of production, MercyMe needed one more song to include on the album. Late at night on the band's bus, Bart Millard found an old notebook with the phrase "I can only imagine" written in it. He began to write a song, basing it on his personal feelings about his father Arthur's death. Early in Bart's life, Arthur had been physically and emotionally abusive towards his family, with Bart being beaten severely at points; Arthur and his wife Adele eventually divorced, and Bart was sent to live with his mother after an especially extreme whipping. Bart kept in contact with his father, however, who was later diagnosed with pancreatic cancer when Bart was 15. His father began to make amends for his actions and started becoming more religiously observant, reading the Bible and going to church regularly. As Arthur progressively became more ill, his relationship with his son improved dramatically; by the time Arthur died in 1991, when Bart was 18, the two were very close. Millard said that "I got a front row seat to see this guy go from being a monster to falling desperately in love with Jesus. By the time he passed away when I was a freshman in college, not only was he my best friend, he was like the Godliest man I’d ever known". After Arthur's death, Bart became obsessed with the phrase "I can only imagine" after hearing his grandmother say that she could only imagine what Arthur was seeing in heaven. Bart Millard found comfort in the thought and began to write it on anything he could find.

Once Millard started writing the song, he estimated that it took him only about ten minutes to write the lyrics. Millard said that it was one of the few songs he had ever written where there were no mistakes in the writing process; "it was just written the way it is and left at that". MercyMe initially attempted to record "I Can Only Imagine" as a fast song, but after several failed attempts, Millard talked with Bryson about arranging it into a slower version. As the band was tearing down the equipment in their recording studio, Bryson began playing a piano intro. Millard immediately decided to use the intro, and the rest of the song was completed in around five minutes. Although the rest of the band did not see how it would fit on the record, as it didn't meet the basic verse-chorus format the rest of the album had, they felt it needed to be included on it because it meant so much to Millard.

The Worship Project was released on October 14, 1999. Sales for the album far exceeded the band's previous efforts; Millard estimated the album's overall sales at 100,000, which other sources peg the album's sales as of 2006 at 60,000 or 65,000 copies. The difficulty of meeting sales demands when selling the album directly, in addition to having to book and manage for themselves, led the band to pursue a contract with a record label; MercyMe would sign with INO Records in 2000. "I Can Only Imagine" was one of several songs from the band's independent records that were selected to be included on their debut album with INO, Almost There (2001).

== Composition ==
I Can Only Imagine
A 25-second audio sample of "I Can Only Imagine" featuring parts of the verse and chorus. The song builds from just piano to include guitar and drums.

"I Can Only Imagine" is set in the key of E major and has a tempo of 80 beats per minute. Bart Millard's vocal range in the song spans from the low note of B_{3} to the high note of G♯_{5}. Millard is credited with writing and composing the song. A contemporary Christian and pop song, "I Can Only Imagine" has been considered both a ballad and a power ballad. The song opens up with only a piano, building up to include guitar and drums.

The song has a directly Christian message; its religious lyrics weren't edited for mainstream radio. In the song, the narrator wonders what it would be like to stand before God in heaven. In the refrain, the singer ponders "Will I dance for You Jesus/or in awe of You be still/Will I stand in Your presence or to my knees will I fall/Will I sing hallelujah/will I be able to speak at all/I can only imagine/I can only imagine". Regarding the lyrical theme of "I Can Only Imagine", Millard explained to Fox News that "I was always told that if [my father] could choose, he would rather be in Heaven than here with me. As a Christian I believed that, but as an 18-year-old it was a little hard to swallow. So the questions in the song came from me asking God what was so great about Him that my dad would rather be there."

== Critical reception ==
Critical reception for "I Can Only Imagine" was positive. Steve Losey of AllMusic praised it as being "passionate" and "emotionally compelling". Kevin Chamberlin of Jesus Freak Hideout said the song's lyrics were "amazing". It was called the "definite highlight" of Almost There by New Release Tuesday's Kevin McNeese, who also praised its piano intro, saying it "instantly invokes chills", as well as the song's lyrical content. Charisma writer Margaret Feinburg lauded the song's "heart-gripping" lyrics, and it was cited as the centerpiece of the album by Megumi Nakamura of Cross Rhythms, who called it "beautiful and touching". Writing for CCM Magazine, Adam Woodroof described the song as "heavenly" and said it was the highlight of Almost There. Although Russ Breimeier of Christianity Today called it "beautiful and inspiring", he questioned if "I Can Only Imagine" was actually a worship song.

At the 33rd GMA Dove Awards in 2002, I Can Only Imagine" earned the GMA Dove Awards for Pop/Contemporary Recorded Song of the Year and Song of the Year. Millard won the award for Songwriter of the Year at the same ceremony as well as at the 25th American Society of Composers, Authors and Publishers (ASCAP) Christian Music Awards, held on June 2, 2003. In 2004, CCM Magazine ranked "I Can Only Imagine" as the fourth-greatest song in Christian music.

=== Legacy ===
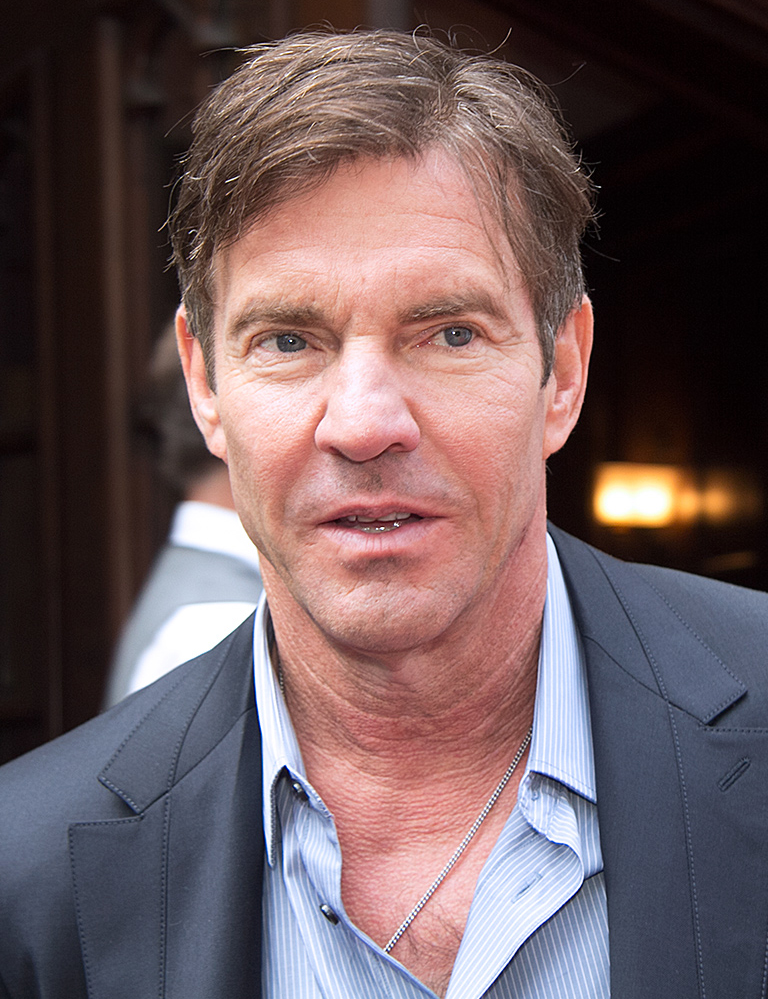
Actor Dennis Quaid portrayed Arthur Millard, Bart Millard's father, in the 2018 film I Can Only Imagine.

"I Can Only Imagine" has been regarded as MercyMe's "breakthrough hit" as well as their signature song. It is the most-played song in the history of Christian radio and one of the most-played songs in the history of contemporary music. As of April 2018, it is the best-selling Christian song of all time. It has consistently ranked among the best-selling Christian digital songs each year in the Billboard year-end charts, ranging from number 19 in 2016 to number three in 2018. It is often requested to be played at funerals. "I Can Only Imagine" was named the official inspirational song for the state of Oklahoma in 2018; the measure was passed by the Oklahoma Legislature and signed by Governor Mary Fallin.

The story behind "I Can Only Imagine" was adapted into a film. Directed by the Erwin Brothers and starring J. Michael Finley as Bart Millard and Dennis Quaid as Arthur Millard, the movie was released to theaters on March 16, 2018. It received mixed to positive reviews from critics, and exceeded initial expectations at the box office, grossing $17.1 million in its opening week. This was the fourth best-ever opening for a faith-based film, behind only The Passion of the Christ, Son of God, and Heaven Is for Real. The film finished its theatrical run having grossed $83.4 million in the United States and Canada and $1.8 million in other territories for a worldwide total of $85.2 million. As of August 2019, it ranks as the fifth-highest grossing music biopic of all time in the United States (behind Bohemian Rhapsody, Straight Outta Compton, Walk the Line, and Rocketman) and was the highest-grossing independent film of 2018.

== Release and promotion ==
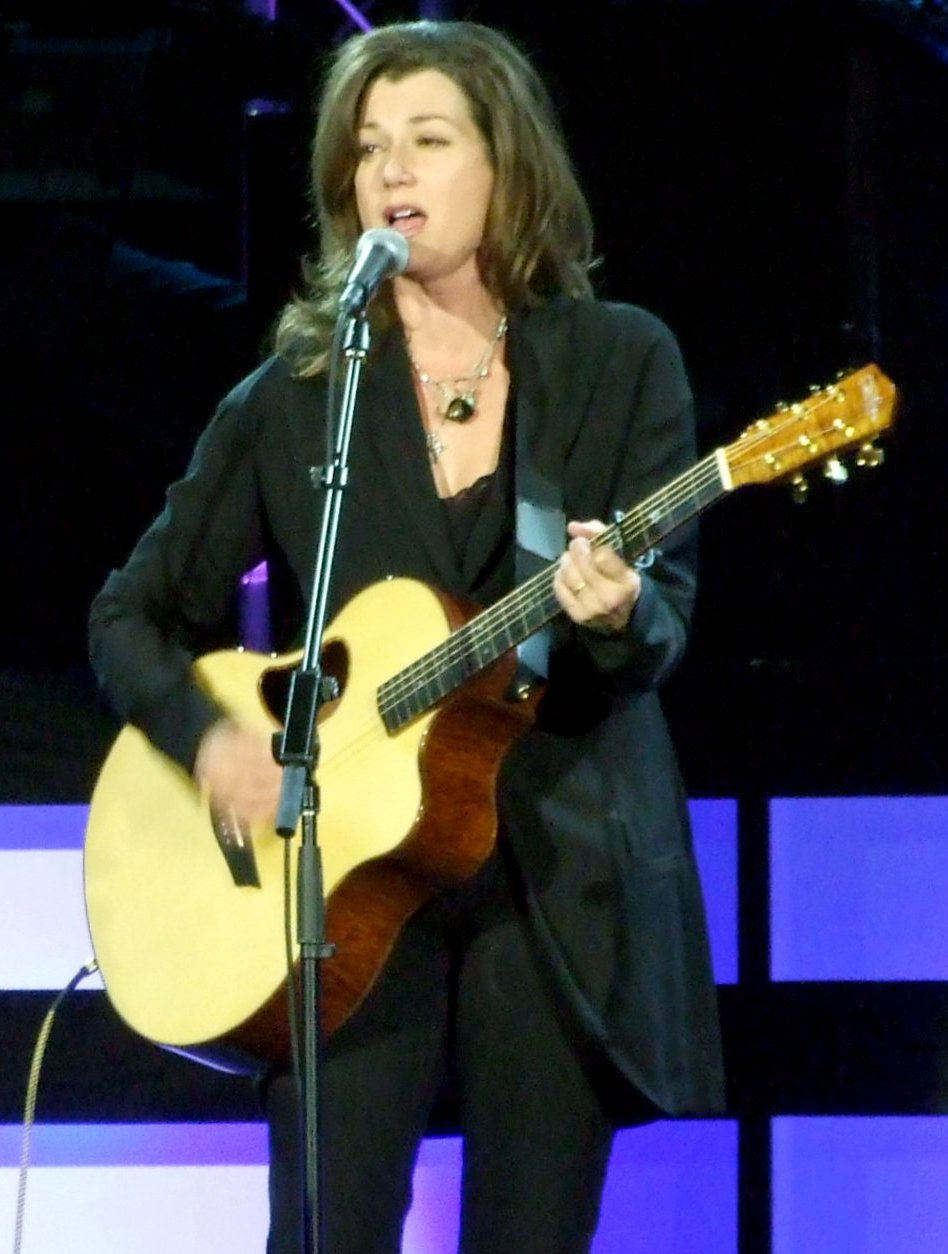
Amy Grant, originally given the rights to release "I Can Only Imagine" as a single, gave the rights back to MercyMe in 2001. She later released her version of "I Can Only Imagine" in 2002, pairing it in a medley with "Sing the Wondrous Love of Jesus".

Originally, "I Can Only Imagine" was set to be released by fellow Christian artist Amy Grant. Millard had initially declined a request from Grant's record label to allow her to record the song; some segments of the Christian community had reacted negatively to her divorce, and Millard wasn't sure if he wanted to be involved. After consulting with his pastor, who felt Millard should accept the opportunity, he began to reconsider, and finally agreed to let her cover it after talking with Grant over the phone. Grant had planned to release her version of the song as the lead single from her upcoming album and MercyMe would release a different song as their first single, hoping to capitalize on having written what would presumably become a major hit for Grant. The band released their first single from Almost There, "Bless Me Indeed (Jabez's Song)", which performed poorly at Christian radio, leading to poor sales of the album. Plans were made to release another single from the record, but the band's manager, Scott Brickell, decided to reach out to Grant to see if she still planned to release her version as a single. Grant gave MercyMe her blessing to release the song as a single and signed the rights back to the band; "I Can Only Imagine" was released on October 12, 2001, as the album's second single.

The song debuted on the Christian AC chart on November 2, 2001, reached the No. 1 position on February 22, 2002, and spent two weeks at the top spot. It also peaked at No. 15 on the Radio & Records Christian CHR chart. The song became the most-played song on Christian radio in 2002. As a result of its success on radio, Almost There experienced a "surge" in sales, debuting on the Billboard 200 in December 2001 and entering the top ten on the Christian Albums chart in January 2002. The song stayed on Christian radio for so long that plans to release a third single from Almost There were cancelled, with the band instead beginning work on a new album.

In 2003, a Dallas mainstream radio station, 100.3 Wild-FM, played the song on its morning show, The Fitz Radio Program. They had responded to a caller's repeated requests and the urgings of the program's producer, Todd Sheppard, a former seminary student. Although it had been played almost as joke, it soon became the most requested and most played song on the station. After hearing the song played on the station, Millard called-in and spoke with the crew, and MercyMe then came in and played the song live. Big Gay Steven, one of the show's hosts, described their audience's response to the song as "overwhelming". As other mainstream stations around the country began to play the song, MercyMe's label, INO Records, partnered with Curb Records to market the single to mainstream radio. Its initial success was seen as surprising due to its overtly religious themes, although several other Christian artists had begun achieving mainstream success at the same time, including Stacie Orrico, whose singles "Stuck" and "(There's Gotta Be) More to Life" had both hit the Billboard Hot 100. Curb began to promote the song to adult contemporary and Top 40 radio, and INO and Curb released a double A-side physical single, "I Can Only Imagine/Word of God Speak", in September 2003.

"I Can Only Imagine" debuted on the Adult Contemporary chart on May 23, 2003, eventually peaking at No. 5 for the chart week of September 8, 2003. "I Can Only Imagine" spent 30 weeks on the chart. The song debuted on the Billboard Hot 100 for the chart week of October 11, 2003 at No. 76. The song peaked at No. 71 and spent 16 non-consecutive weeks on the chart. "I Can Only Imagine" also peaked at No. 1 on the Billboard Hot 100 Singles Sales chart, a component chart of the Billboard Hot 100 that ranks the best-selling physical single releases, for 10 weeks. During the week of November 22, 2003, it became the first No. 1 physical single to be outsold by the highest-selling digital single of the week; for that week, "I Can Only Imagine" sold 7,500 physical copies in the United States while Outkast's "Hey Ya!" sold 8,500 digital downloads. The song also charted on the Mainstream Top 40, Adult Top 40, and Country Songs charts.

In 2012, "I Can Only Imagine" appeared on France's Syndicat National de l'Édition Phonographique (SNEP) chart, spending two weeks and peaking at No. 65. In March 2018, following the release of the film I Can Only Imagine, which was based on the song's story, it appeared on the Billboard Christian Songs chart; because the chart had been created after the song's original run on Christian radio, it was eligible to chart for the first time. It debuted at No. 2 on the Billboard Christian Songs chart and also spent a third week at No. 1 on the Billboard Christian Digital Songs chart; the song had spent 425 weeks on the chart at that point, the longest run of any song in the chart's history. "I Can Only Imagine" peaked at No. 1 on the Christian Songs chart on March 31, 2018, and spent three weeks at the top spot. It also peaked at No. 10 on the Billboard Digital Songs chart and ranked at No. 8 on the 2018 year-end Christian Songs chart.

In April 2010, "I Can Only Imagine" was certified platinum by the RIAA, signifying sales of over 1 million digital downloads. It was the first single by any artist in the Christian music genre to go platinum. The song was certified double platinum in September 2014, triple platinum in June 2018, and quadruple platinum in September 2019. As of March 2018, it has sold 2.5 million copies, making it the best-selling Christian single of all time.

== Music video ==
Millard holding his father's photograph in the music video.

A music video was released for "I Can Only Imagine". According to Millard, the video's inspiration came from seeing people holding empty picture frames at their concerts, symbolizing their deceased loved ones. Millard said that the "I've had so many people after a show pull out a picture of someone they've lost. These people embrace these photos and I just thought how can we tap into that". The video features everyday people as well as several music artists including Michael Tait, Tammy Trent, Bob Herdman, and Jesse Katina, each holding an empty picture frame to signify their loss of a loved one; as the video progresses, they are holding pictures of their loved ones including Millard with his father's photograph.

== Live performances ==
Despite including "I Can Only Imagine" on The Worship Project, MercyMe initially did not perform the song in concerts because they felt it did not fit with the rest of the record. The band's first performance of the song did not come until the summer after the release of The Worship Project at a summer camp at the request of a camp counselor. The band has played the song at every show since as of February 2009 MercyMe's 2004 concert tour (the Imagine Tour) and 2018–19 tour (the Imagine Nation Tour) both took their name from the song.

MercyMe performed "I Can Only Imagine" at the 33rd GMA Dove Awards, with an accompanying "inspiring video that underscored the emotional and inspirational power of song". The band also performed the song at the 40th GMA Dove Awards, held on April 23, 2009, in a medley with "Finally Home". At the 2017 National Prayer Breakfast, MercyMe performed the song with President Donald Trump in attendance. In March 2018, MercyMe performed "I Can Only Imagine" live on Fox & Friends to promote the film.

== Other versions ==
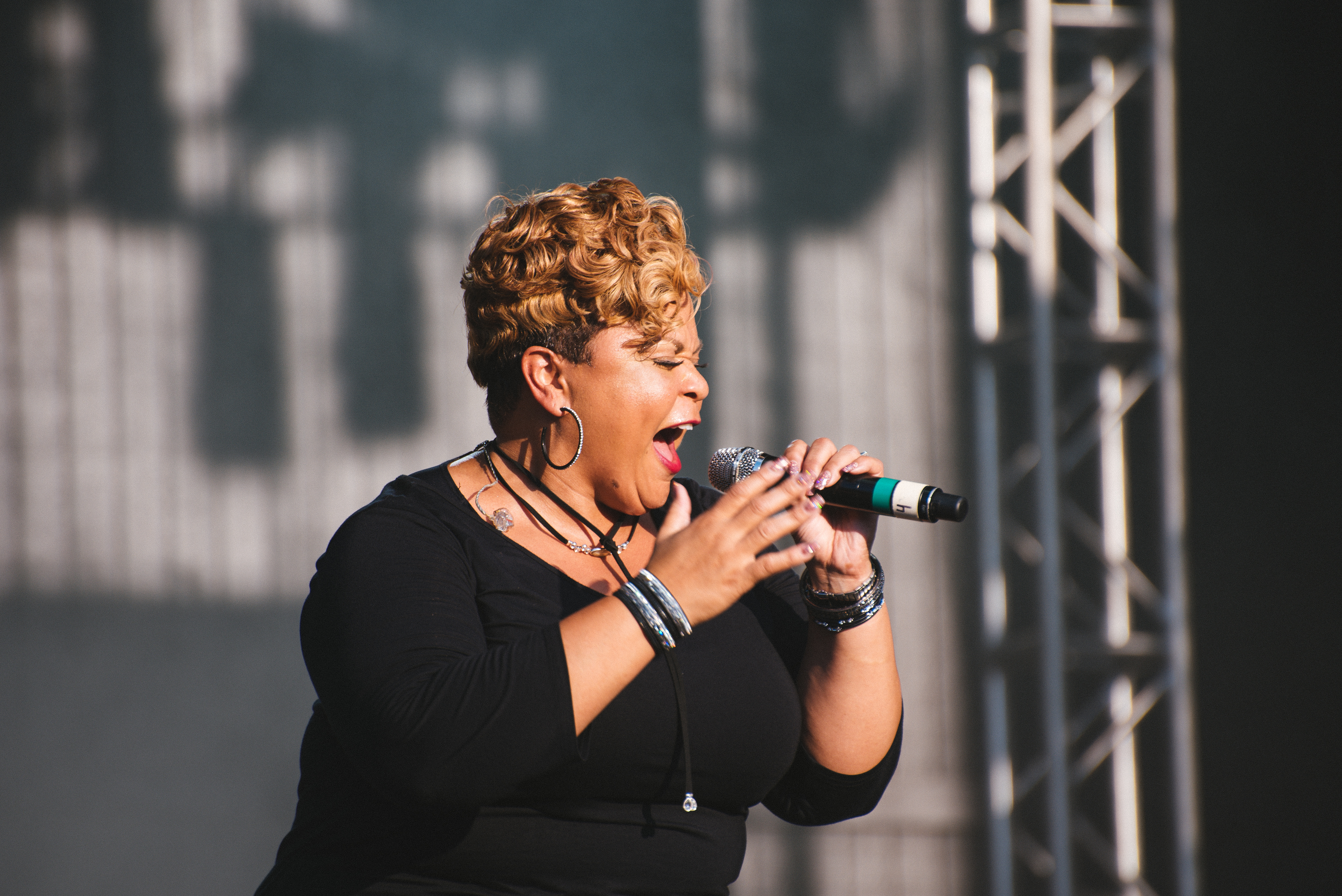
Gospel singer Tamela Mann's version of "I Can Only Imagine" spent 13 weeks at No. 1 on the Billboard Gospel Songs chart.

Both an acoustic and live version of "I Can Only Imagine" were included in the Platinum edition of Almost There, which was released in August 2006. MercyMe released a new recording of the song on their iTunes Originals album, which was released in March 2008. On their compilation album 10, MercyMe released a new recording of the song featuring the London Session Orchestra as well as a live version. For their 2018 compilation album I Can Only Imagine: The Very Best of MercyMe, released to commemorate the release of the movie, the band recorded an updated recording titled "I Can Only Imagine (The Movie Session)", which peaked at No. 19 on the Billboard Christian Songs chart.

"I Can Only Imagine" has been covered by several artists. In 2002, Amy Grant released her reworked version of the song, titled "Imagine" and paired with "Sing the Wondrous Love of Jesus", on her album Legacy... Hymns and Faith. Country singer Jeff Carson's 2003 cover peaked at No. 50 on the Country Songs chart, and in 2014, gospel singer Tamela Mann's cover of the song spent 13 weeks atop the Billboard Gospel Songs chart. In May 2017, Aliyah Moulden, the third-place finisher on the 12th season of the reality competition show The Voice, performed the song on the show; her version debuted and peaked at No. 4 on the Billboard Christian Songs chart, selling 15,000 copies in its first week and spending two weeks on the chart in total.

== Track listing ==
CD release

1. "I Can Only Imagine" – 4:06 (Bart Millard)
2. "Word of God Speak" – 3:07 (Peter Kipley, Millard)

== Personnel ==
(Credits from the album liner notes)

MercyMe

- Bart Millard – vocals
- Jim Bryson – keyboards
- Nathan Cochran – bass guitar, background vocals
- Mike Scheuchzer – guitar, background vocals
- Robby Shaffer – drums

Additional performers

- Paltrow Performance Group – strings

Technical

- Julian Kindred – engineer
- Pete Kipley – producer, programming
- Skye McCaskey – engineer
- Salvo – mixing
- Shane Wilson – mixing

== Release and radio history ==
| Date | Territory | Label | Format |
|---|---|---|---|
| October 12, 2001 | United States | INO | Radio |
| September 23, 2003 | United States | INO/Curb | CD single |
| January 4, 2005 | United States | INO/Epic | Digital download |

== Charts ==
=== Weekly charts ===
Weekly chart performance for "I Can Only Imagine"
| Chart (2002) | Peak position |
|---|---|
| US Christian AC (Radio & Records) | 1 |
| US Christian CHR (Radio & Records) | 15 |
| Chart (2003) | Peak position |
| US Billboard Hot 100 | 71 |
| US Adult Contemporary (Billboard) | 5 |
| US Country Airplay (Billboard) | 52 |
| US Adult Pop Airplay (Billboard) | 27 |
| US Hot Singles Sales (Billboard) | 4 |
| US Pop Airplay (Billboard) | 33 |
| Chart (2004) | Peak position |
| US Hot Country Songs (Billboard) | 52 |
| Chart (2010) | Peak position |
| US Christian Digital Song Sales (Billboard) | 9 |
| Chart (2011) | Peak position |
| US Christian Digital Song Sales (Billboard) | 5 |
| Chart (2012) | Peak position |
| France (SNEP) | 65 |
| Chart (2013) | Peak position |
| US Christian Digital Song Sales (Billboard) | 2 |
| Chart (2017) | Peak position |
| US Christian Digital Song Sales (Billboard) | 1 |
| Chart (2018) | Peak position |
| US Christian Airplay (Billboard) | 26 |
| US Digital Song Sales (Billboard) | 10 |
| US Hot Christian Songs (Billboard) | 1 |

=== Year-end charts ===
Year-end performance for "I Can Only Imagine"
| Chart (2003) | Position |
|---|---|
| US Adult Contemporary (Billboard) | 20 |
| US Hot Singles Sales (Billboard) | 24 |
| Chart (2004) | Position |
| US Hot Single Sales (Billboard) | 19 |
| Chart (2010) | Position |
| US Christian Digital Song Sales (Billboard) | 9 |
| Chart (2011) | Position |
| US Christian Digital Song Sales (Billboard) | 7 |
| Chart (2012) | Position |
| US Christian Digital Song Sales (Billboard) | 6 |
| Chart (2013) | Position |
| US Christian Digital Song Sales (Billboard) | 5 |
| Chart (2014) | Position |
| US Christian Digital Song Sales (Billboard) | 8 |
| Chart (2015) | Position |
| US Christian Digital Song Sales (Billboard) | 13 |
| Chart (2016) | Position |
| US Christian Digital Song Sales (Billboard) | 19 |
| Chart (2017) | Position |
| US Christian Digital Song Sales (Billboard) | 7 |
| Chart (2018) | Position |
| US Hot Christian Songs (Billboard) | 8 |
| Chart (2019) | Position |
| US Christian Digital Song Sales (Billboard) | 5 |
| US Christian Streaming Songs (Billboard) | 7 |
| Chart (2020) | Position |
| US Christian Digital Song Sales (Billboard) | 7 |
| US Christian Streaming Songs (Billboard) | 9 |
| Chart (2021) | Position |
| US Christian Digital Song Sales (Billboard) | 8 |
| US Christian Streaming Songs (Billboard) | 24 |
| Chart (2022) | Position |
| US Christian Digital Song Sales (Billboard) | 5 |
| US Christian Streaming Songs (Billboard) | 15 |
| Chart (2023) | Position |
| US Christian Digital Song Sales (Billboard) | 8 |
| US Christian Streaming Songs (Billboard) | 12 |
| Chart (2024) | Position |
| US Christian Digital Song Sales (Billboard) | 10 |
| US Christian Streaming Songs (Billboard) | 18 |

== Certifications ==
| Region | Certification | Certified units/sales |
|---|---|---|
| United States (RIAA) | 5× Platinum | 5,000,000^{‡} |
^{‡} Sales+streaming figures based on certification alone.
