= List of Billboard Christian Songs number ones of the 2010s =

Christian Songs is a record chart compiled and published by Billboard that measures the top-performing contemporary Christian music songs in the United States. The data was compiled by Nielsen Broadcast Data Systems based on the weekly audience impressions of each song played on contemporary Christian radio stations until the end of November 2013. With the Billboard issue dated December 7, 2013, the Christian Songs chart began utilizing the same methodology used for the Hot 100 chart to compile its rankings; that is, measuring the airplay of Christian songs across all radio formats, while incorporating data from digital sales and streaming activity. The Christian Airplay listing, which had been published for the first time in 2013, was based solely on Christian radio airplay, a methodology which had previously been used for a decade for Hot Christian Songs.

== Details ==
In 2010, ten songs by ten artists achieved a No. 1 single, either as a leading artist or featured artist. TobyMac recorded two No. 1s, while Amy Grant achieved one as a featured artist with Matthew West. MercyMe's "All of Creation, Chris Tomlin's "Our God", and Sanctus Real's "Lead Me" tied for the longest-running No. 1 single of 2010, with all three spending a total of nine weeks atop the chart. "All of Creation" was the top ranked song on the year-end chart.

In 2011, seventeen songs by thirteen artists achieved a No. 1 single, either as a leading artist or featured artist. MercyMe, Casting Crowns, and Tenth Avenue North recorded two No. 1s each, while Leigh Nash achieved one as a featured artist with tobyMac. MercyMe and Casting Crowns also tied for the longest-running No. 1 single of 2011, with "Move" and "Glorious Day (Living He Loved Me)" each spending a total of nine weeks atop the chart. Tenth Avenue North's "You Are More" was the top-ranked song on the year-end chart.

In 2012, there were nine No. 1 on the Christian Songs chart by ten artists (Aaron Shust's "My Hope Is in You" first reached the top in 2011 and is not counted in the total). Passion's "One Thing Remains" features Kristian Stanfill. Building 429's "Where I Belong" spent 15 consecutive weeks at No. 1, the longest-running No. 1 single of the year, and was ranked as the top Christian song of 2012. Matt Redman's "10,000 Reasons (Bless the Lord)" had three separate stints at No. 1 for a total of 13 weeks.

In 2013, only four artists topped the Christian Songs chart. Songs by Big Daddy Weave and Passion featuring Kristian Stanfill are not included in the total; "Redeemed" (three weeks in 2013, seven weeks in total) and "One Thing Remains" (three separate stints at No. 1, two weeks in 2013, four weeks in total), respectively, first reached the top in 2012. Chris Tomlin's "Whom Shall I Fear (God of Angel Armies)" was ranked as the top Christian Song of 2013, having earned a cumulative total of 15 weeks on top of the chart. Matthew West's "Hello My Name Is", however, spent more time at No. 1, scoring 17 weeks atop the chart. In September 2013, Hillsong United's "Oceans (Where Feet May Fail)" took over from Mandisa's "Overcomer", starting a record 57-week run at No. 1.

In 2014, only two artists went to No. 1 on the Billboard Christian Songs chart: Hillsong United and Carrie Underwood. Hillsong United's "Oceans (Where Feet May Fail)" continued its run from 2013 and was ranked as the top Christian Song of 2013. In mid-October, Underwood's "Something in the Water" went to No. 1, and maintained its top position until the end of 2014 leading into the first quarter of 2015.

In 2018, only six artists topped the Christian Songs chart. Brooke Simpson's cover of "O Holy Night" spend a week at the top. Hillsong Worship's "What a Beautiful Name" spent its last eight weeks at No. 1. TobyMac's "I Just Need U" debuted at the top of the chart for one week. Cory Asbury's "Reckless Love" spent eighteen weeks on top, being ranked as the top Christian Song of 2018. MercyMe's "I Can Only Imagine" was sent to the top of the chart buoyed by a release of a film inspired by the song. For the rest of the year, Lauren Daigle's "You Say" spent twenty-three consecutive weeks, becoming the fifth longest running song in the chart's history.

== Number-one songs ==
Key
No.	nth song to top the chart
†	No. 1 song of the year

=== Hot Christian Songs ===
No.	Issue date	Artist	Single	Ref.
2010
44	January 2	tobyMac	"City on Our Knees"	
45	January 9	Matthew West featuring Amy Grant	"Give This Christmas Away"	
re	January 16	tobyMac	"City on Our Knees"	
re	January 23	tobyMac	"City on Our Knees"	
46	January 30	Casting Crowns	"Until the Whole World Hears"	
re	February 6	tobyMac	"City on Our Knees"	
re	February 13	Casting Crowns	"Until the Whole World Hears"	
47	February 20	Kutless	"What Faith Can Do"	
47	February 27	Kutless	"What Faith Can Do"	
47	March 5	Kutless	"What Faith Can Do"	
47	March 12	Kutless	"What Faith Can Do"	
47	March 19	Kutless	"What Faith Can Do"	
47	March 26	Kutless	"What Faith Can Do"	
47	April 3	Kutless	"What Faith Can Do"	
47	April 10	Kutless	"What Faith Can Do"	
48	April 17	MercyMe	"All of Creation"†	
48	April 24	MercyMe	"All of Creation"†	
48	May 1	MercyMe	"All of Creation"†	
48	May 8	MercyMe	"All of Creation"†	
48	May 15	MercyMe	"All of Creation"†	
48	May 22	MercyMe	"All of Creation"†	
48	May 29	MercyMe	"All of Creation"†	
48	June 5	MercyMe	"All of Creation"†	
48	June 12	MercyMe	"All of Creation"†	
49	June 19	tobyMac	"Get Back Up"	
49	June 26	tobyMac	"Get Back Up"	
49	July 3	tobyMac	"Get Back Up"	
50	July 10	Chris Tomlin	"Our God"	
50	July 17	Chris Tomlin	"Our God"	
50	July 24	Chris Tomlin	"Our God"	
50	July 31	Chris Tomlin	"Our God"	
50	August 7	Chris Tomlin	"Our God"	
50	August 14	Chris Tomlin	"Our God"	
50	August 21	Chris Tomlin	"Our God"	
50	August 28	Chris Tomlin	"Our God"	
50	September 4	Chris Tomlin	"Our God"	
51	September 11	Sanctus Real	"Lead Me"	
51	September 18	Sanctus Real	"Lead Me"	
51	September 25	Sanctus Real	"Lead Me"	
51	October 2	Sanctus Real	"Lead Me"	
51	October 9	Sanctus Real	"Lead Me"	
51	October 16	Sanctus Real	"Lead Me"	
51	October 23	Sanctus Real	"Lead Me"	
51	October 30	Sanctus Real	"Lead Me"	
51	November 6	Sanctus Real	"Lead Me"	
52	November 13	Chris August	"Starry Night"	
52	November 20	Chris August	"Starry Night"	
52	November 27	Chris August	"Starry Night"	
52	December 4	Chris August	"Starry Night"	
52	December 11	Chris August	"Starry Night"	
53	December 18	The Afters	"Light Up the Sky"	
53	December 25	The Afters	"Light Up the Sky"	
2011
54	January 1	tobyMac featuring Leigh Nash	"Christmas This Year"	
54	January 8	tobyMac featuring Leigh Nash	"Christmas This Year"	
re	January 15	Chris August	"Starry Night"	
55	January 22	Brandon Heath	"Your Love"	
55	January 29	Brandon Heath	"Your Love"	
55	February 5	Brandon Heath	"Your Love"	
55	February 12	Brandon Heath	"Your Love"	
55	February 19	Brandon Heath	"Your Love"	
55	February 26	Brandon Heath	"Your Love"	
55	March 5	Brandon Heath	"Your Love"	
55	March 12	Brandon Heath	"Your Love"	
56	March 19	MercyMe	"Beautiful"	
57	March 26	Tenth Avenue North	"You Are More"†	
57	April 2	Tenth Avenue North	"You Are More"†	
57	April 9	Tenth Avenue North	"You Are More"†	
57	April 16	Tenth Avenue North	"You Are More"†	
58	April 23	Casting Crowns	"Glorious Day (Living He Loved Me)"	
58	April 30	Casting Crowns	"Glorious Day (Living He Loved Me)"	
58	May 7	Casting Crowns	"Glorious Day (Living He Loved Me)"	
58	May 14	Casting Crowns	"Glorious Day (Living He Loved Me)"	
58	May 21	Casting Crowns	"Glorious Day (Living He Loved Me)"	
58	May 28	Casting Crowns	"Glorious Day (Living He Loved Me)"	
58	June 4	Casting Crowns	"Glorious Day (Living He Loved Me)"	
58	June 11	Casting Crowns	"Glorious Day (Living He Loved Me)"	
59	June 18	Mandisa	"Stronger"	
60	June 25	Laura Story	"Blessings"	
60	July 2	Laura Story	"Blessings"	
60	July 9	Laura Story	"Blessings"	
60	July 16	Laura Story	"Blessings"	
61	July 23	Sidewalk Prophets	"You Love Me Anyway"	
re	July 30	Casting Crowns	"Glorious Day (Living He Loved Me)"	
re	August 6	Sidewalk Prophets	"You Love Me Anyway"	
62	August 13	Jeremy Camp	"The Way"	
63	August 20	Chris Tomlin	"I Lift My Hands"	
re	August 27	Jeremy Camp	"The Way"	
64	September 3	MercyMe	"Move"	
64	September 10	MercyMe	"Move"	
64	September 17	MercyMe	"Move"	
64	September 24	MercyMe	"Move"	
64	October 1	MercyMe	"Move"	
64	October 8	MercyMe	"Move"	
64	October 15	MercyMe	"Move"	
64	October 22	MercyMe	"Move"	
64	October 29	MercyMe	"Move"	
65	November 5	Casting Crowns	"Courageous"	
65	November 12	Casting Crowns	"Courageous"	
65	November 19	Casting Crowns	"Courageous"	
65	November 26	Casting Crowns	"Courageous"	
66	December 3	Aaron Shust	"My Hope Is in You"	
re	December 10	Casting Crowns	"Courageous"	
67	December 17	Tenth Avenue North	"Strong Enough to Save"	
67	December 24	Tenth Avenue North	"Strong Enough to Save"	
67	December	Tenth Avenue North	"Strong Enough to Save"	
2012
68	January 7	Josh Wilson	"Jesus Is Alive"	
re	January 14	Aaron Shust	"My Hope Is in You"	
re	January 21	Aaron Shust	"My Hope Is in You"	
re	January 28	Aaron Shust	"My Hope Is in You"	
re	February 4	Aaron Shust	"My Hope Is in You"	
re	February 11	Aaron Shust	"My Hope Is in You"	
re	February 18	Aaron Shust	"My Hope Is in You"	
re	February 25	Aaron Shust	"My Hope Is in You"	
re	March 3	Aaron Shust	"My Hope Is in You"	
69	March 10	Building 429	"Where I Belong"†	
69	March 17	Building 429	"Where I Belong"†	
69	March 24	Building 429	"Where I Belong"†	
69	March 31	Building 429	"Where I Belong"†	
69	April 7	Building 429	"Where I Belong"†	
69	April 14	Building 429	"Where I Belong"†	
69	April 21	Building 429	"Where I Belong"†	
69	April 28	Building 429	"Where I Belong"†	
69	May 5	Building 429	"Where I Belong"†	
69	May 12	Building 429	"Where I Belong"†	
69	May 19	Building 429	"Where I Belong"†	
69	May 26	Building 429	"Where I Belong"†	
69	June 2	Building 429	"Where I Belong"†	
69	June 9	Building 429	"Where I Belong"†	
69	June 16	Building 429	"Where I Belong"†	
70	June 23	MercyMe	"The Hurt & The Healer"	
70	June 30	MercyMe	"The Hurt & The Healer"	
70	July 7	MercyMe	"The Hurt & The Healer"	
70	July 14	MercyMe	"The Hurt & The Healer"	
70	July 21	MercyMe	"The Hurt & The Healer"	
71	July 28	Matt Redman	"10,000 Reasons (Bless the Lord)"	
71	August 4	Matt Redman	"10,000 Reasons (Bless the Lord)"	
71	August 11	Matt Redman	"10,000 Reasons (Bless the Lord)"	
71	August 18	Matt Redman	"10,000 Reasons (Bless the Lord)"	
71	August 25	Matt Redman	"10,000 Reasons (Bless the Lord)"	
72	September 1	tobyMac	Me Without You"	
re	September 8	Matt Redman	"10,000 Reasons (Bless the Lord)"	
re	September 15	Matt Redman	"10,000 Reasons (Bless the Lord)"	
re	September 22	Matt Redman	"10,000 Reasons (Bless the Lord)"	
re	September 29	tobyMac	"Me Without You"	
re	October 6	Matt Redman	"10,000 Reasons (Bless the Lord)"	
re	October 13	Matt Redman	"10,000 Reasons (Bless the Lord)"	
re	October 20	Matt Redman	"10,000 Reasons (Bless the Lord)"	
re	October 27	Matt Redman	"10,000 Reasons (Bless the Lord)"	
re	November 3	Matt Redman	"10,000 Reasons (Bless the Lord)"	
73	November 10	Big Daddy Weave	"Redeemed"	
73	November 17	Big Daddy Weave	"Redeemed"	
73	November 24	Big Daddy Weave	"Redeemed"	
73	December 1	Big Daddy Weave	"Redeemed"	
74	December 8	Third Day	"I Need a Miracle"	
75	December 15	Passion featuring Kristian Stanfill	"One Thing Remains"	
75	December 22	Passion featuring Kristian Stanfill	"One Thing Remains"	
76	December 29	Steven Curtis Chapman	"Christmas Time Again"	
2013
76	January 5	Steven Curtis Chapman	"Christmas Time Again"	
re	January 12	Big Daddy Weave	"Redeemed"	
re	January 19	Big Daddy Weave	"Redeemed"	
re	January 26	Big Daddy Weave	"Redeemed"	
re	February 2	Passion featuring Kristian Stanfill	"One Thing Remains"	
77	February 9	Chris Tomlin	"Whom Shall I Fear (God of Angel Armies)"†	
77	February 16	Chris Tomlin	"Whom Shall I Fear (God of Angel Armies)"†	
77	February 23	Chris Tomlin	"Whom Shall I Fear (God of Angel Armies)"†	
re	March 2	Passion featuring Kristian Stanfill	"One Thing Remains"	
re	March 9	Chris Tomlin	Whom Shall I Fear (God of Angel Armies)"†	
re	March 16	Chris Tomlin	Whom Shall I Fear (God of Angel Armies)"†	
re	March 23	Chris Tomlin	Whom Shall I Fear (God of Angel Armies)"†	
re	March 30	Chris Tomlin	Whom Shall I Fear (God of Angel Armies)"†	
re	April 6	Chris Tomlin	Whom Shall I Fear (God of Angel Armies)"†	
re	April 13	Chris Tomlin	Whom Shall I Fear (God of Angel Armies)"†	
re	April 20	Chris Tomlin	Whom Shall I Fear (God of Angel Armies)"†	
re	April 27	Chris Tomlin	Whom Shall I Fear (God of Angel Armies)"†	
re	May 4	Chris Tomlin	Whom Shall I Fear (God of Angel Armies)"†	
re	May 11	Chris Tomlin	Whom Shall I Fear (God of Angel Armies)"†	
re	May 18	Chris Tomlin	Whom Shall I Fear (God of Angel Armies)"†	
re	May 25	Chris Tomlin	Whom Shall I Fear (God of Angel Armies)"†	
78	June 1	Matthew West	"Hello, My Name Is"	
78	June 8	Matthew West	"Hello, My Name Is"	
78	June 15	Matthew West	"Hello, My Name Is"	
78	June 22	Matthew West	"Hello, My Name Is"	
78	June 29	Matthew West	"Hello, My Name Is"	
78	July 6	Matthew West	"Hello, My Name Is"	
78	July 13	Matthew West	"Hello, My Name Is"	
78	July 20	Matthew West	"Hello, My Name Is"	
78	July 27	Matthew West	"Hello, My Name Is"	
78	August 3	Matthew West	"Hello, My Name Is"	
78	August 10	Matthew West	"Hello, My Name Is"	
78	August 17	Matthew West	"Hello, My Name Is"	
78	August 24	Matthew West	"Hello, My Name Is"	
78	August 31	Matthew West	"Hello, My Name Is"	
78	September 7	Matthew West	"Hello, My Name Is"	
78	September 14	Matthew West	"Hello, My Name Is"	
78	September 21	Matthew West	"Hello, My Name Is"	
79	September 28	Mandisa	"Overcomer"	
79	October 5	Mandisa	"Overcomer"	
79	October 12	Mandisa	"Overcomer"	
79	October 19	Mandisa	"Overcomer"	
79	October 26	Mandisa	"Overcomer"	
79	November 2	Mandisa	"Overcomer"	
79	November 9	Mandisa	"Overcomer"	
79	November 16	Mandisa	"Overcomer"	
79	November 30	Mandisa	"Overcomer"	
80	December 7	Hillsong United	"Oceans (Where Feet May Fail)"†	
80	December 14	Hillsong United	"Oceans (Where Feet May Fail)"†	
80	December 21	Hillsong United	"Oceans (Where Feet May Fail)"†	
80	December 28	Hillsong United	"Oceans (Where Feet May Fail)"†	
2014
80	January 4	Hillsong United	"Oceans (Where Feet May Fail)"†	
80	January 11	Hillsong United	"Oceans (Where Feet May Fail)"†	
80	January 18	Hillsong United	"Oceans (Where Feet May Fail)"†	
80	January 25	Hillsong United	"Oceans (Where Feet May Fail)"†	
80	February 1	Hillsong United	"Oceans (Where Feet May Fail)"†	
80	February 8	Hillsong United	"Oceans (Where Feet May Fail)"†	
80	February 15	Hillsong United	"Oceans (Where Feet May Fail)"†	
80	February 22	Hillsong United	"Oceans (Where Feet May Fail)"†	
80	March 1	Hillsong United	"Oceans (Where Feet May Fail)"†	
80	March 8	Hillsong United	"Oceans (Where Feet May Fail)"†	
80	March 15	Hillsong United	"Oceans (Where Feet May Fail)"†	
80	March 22	Hillsong United	"Oceans (Where Feet May Fail)"†	
80	March 29	Hillsong United	"Oceans (Where Feet May Fail)"†	
80	April 5	Hillsong United	"Oceans (Where Feet May Fail)"†	
80	April 12	Hillsong United	"Oceans (Where Feet May Fail)"†	
80	April 19	Hillsong United	"Oceans (Where Feet May Fail)"†	
80	April 26	Hillsong United	"Oceans (Where Feet May Fail)"†	
80	May 3	Hillsong United	"Oceans (Where Feet May Fail)"†	
80	May 10	Hillsong United	"Oceans (Where Feet May Fail)"†	
80	May 17	Hillsong United	"Oceans (Where Feet May Fail)"†	
80	May 24	Hillsong United	"Oceans (Where Feet May Fail)"†	
80	May 31	Hillsong United	"Oceans (Where Feet May Fail)"†	
80	June 7	Hillsong United	"Oceans (Where Feet May Fail)"†	
80	June 14	Hillsong United	"Oceans (Where Feet May Fail)"†	
80	June 21	Hillsong United	"Oceans (Where Feet May Fail)"†	
80	June 28	Hillsong United	"Oceans (Where Feet May Fail)"†	
80	July 5	Hillsong United	"Oceans (Where Feet May Fail)"†	
80	July 12	Hillsong United	"Oceans (Where Feet May Fail)"†	
80	July 19	Hillsong United	"Oceans (Where Feet May Fail)"†	
80	July 26	Hillsong United	"Oceans (Where Feet May Fail)"†	
80	August 2	Hillsong United	"Oceans (Where Feet May Fail)"†	
80	August 9	Hillsong United	"Oceans (Where Feet May Fail)"†	
80	August 16	Hillsong United	"Oceans (Where Feet May Fail)"†	
80	August 23	Hillsong United	"Oceans (Where Feet May Fail)"†	
80	August 30	Hillsong United	"Oceans (Where Feet May Fail)"†	
80	September 6	Hillsong United	"Oceans (Where Feet May Fail)"†	
80	September 13	Hillsong United	"Oceans (Where Feet May Fail)"†	
80	September 20	Hillsong United	"Oceans (Where Feet May Fail)"†	
80	September 27	Hillsong United	"Oceans (Where Feet May Fail)"†	
80	October 4	Hillsong United	"Oceans (Where Feet May Fail)"†	
80	October 11	Hillsong United	"Oceans (Where Feet May Fail)"†	
81	October 18	Carrie Underwood	"Something in the Water"	
81	October 25	Carrie Underwood	"Something in the Water"	
81	November 1	Carrie Underwood	"Something in the Water"	
81	November 8	Carrie Underwood	"Something in the Water"	
81	November 15	Carrie Underwood	"Something in the Water"	
81	November 22	Carrie Underwood	"Something in the Water"	
81	November 29	Carrie Underwood	"Something in the Water"	
81	December 6	Carrie Underwood	"Something in the Water"	
81	December 13	Carrie Underwood	"Something in the Water"	
81	December 20	Carrie Underwood	"Something in the Water"	
81	December 27	Carrie Underwood	"Something in the Water"	
2015
81	January 3	Carrie Underwood	"Something in the Water"†	
81	January 10	Carrie Underwood	"Something in the Water"†	
81	January 17	Carrie Underwood	"Something in the Water"†	
81	January 24	Carrie Underwood	"Something in the Water"†	
81	January 31	Carrie Underwood	"Something in the Water"†	
81	February 7	Carrie Underwood	"Something in the Water"†	
81	February 14	Carrie Underwood	"Something in the Water"†	
81	February 21	Carrie Underwood	"Something in the Water"†	
81	February 28	Carrie Underwood	"Something in the Water"†	
81	March 7	Carrie Underwood	"Something in the Water"†	
81	March 14	Carrie Underwood	"Something in the Water"†	
81	March 21	Carrie Underwood	"Something in the Water"†	
81	March 28	Carrie Underwood	"Something in the Water"†	
81	April 4	Carrie Underwood	"Something in the Water"†	
81	April 11	Carrie Underwood	"Something in the Water"†	
re	April 18	Hillsong United	"Oceans (Where Feet May Fail)"	
re	April 25	Hillsong United	"Oceans (Where Feet May Fail)"	
re	May 2	Hillsong United	"Oceans (Where Feet May Fail)"	
re	May 9	Hillsong United	"Oceans (Where Feet May Fail)"	
re	May 16	Hillsong United	"Oceans (Where Feet May Fail)"	
82	May 23	Meghan Linsey	"Amazing Grace"	
83	May 30	Needtobreathe featuring Gavin DeGraw	"Brother"	
83	June 6	Needtobreathe featuring Gavin DeGraw	"Brother"	
83	June 13	Needtobreathe featuring Gavin DeGraw	"Brother"	
83	June 20	Needtobreathe featuring Gavin DeGraw	"Brother"	
83	June 27	Needtobreathe featuring Gavin DeGraw	"Brother"	
83	July 4	Needtobreathe featuring Gavin DeGraw	"Brother"	
83	July 11	Needtobreathe featuring Gavin DeGraw	"Brother"	
83	July 18	Needtobreathe featuring Gavin DeGraw	"Brother"	
83	Juny 25	Needtobreathe featuring Gavin DeGraw	"Brother"	
83	August 1	Needtobreathe featuring Gavin DeGraw	"Brother"	
83	August 8	Needtobreathe featuring Gavin DeGraw	"Brother"	
83	August 15	Needtobreathe featuring Gavin DeGraw	"Brother"	
83	August 22	Needtobreathe featuring Gavin DeGraw	"Brother"	
83	August 29	Needtobreathe featuring Gavin DeGraw	"Brother"	
83	September 5	Needtobreathe featuring Gavin DeGraw	"Brother"	
83	September 12	Needtobreathe featuring Gavin DeGraw	"Brother"	
83	September 19	Needtobreathe featuring Gavin DeGraw	"Brother"	
83	September 26	Needtobreathe featuring Gavin DeGraw	"Brother"	
83	October 3	Needtobreathe featuring Gavin DeGraw	"Brother"	
re	October 10	Hillsong United	"Oceans (Where Feet May Fail)"	
re	October 17	Hillsong United	"Oceans (Where Feet May Fail)"	
re	October 24	Hillsong United	"Oceans (Where Feet May Fail)"	
re	October 31	Hillsong United	"Oceans (Where Feet May Fail)"	
re	November 7	Hillsong United	"Oceans (Where Feet May Fail)"	
re	November 14	Hillsong United	"Oceans (Where Feet May Fail)"	
re	November 21	Hillsong United	"Oceans (Where Feet May Fail)"	
re	November 28	Hillsong United	"Oceans (Where Feet May Fail)"	
84	December 5	Jordan Smith	"Great Is Thy Faithfulness"	
84	December 12	Jordan Smith	"Great Is Thy Faithfulness"	
85	December 19	Jordan Smith	"Hallelujah"	
86	December 26	Braiden Sunshine	"Amazing Grace"	
2016
87	January 2	Jordan Smith	"Mary, Did You Know?"	
88	January 9	Lindsey Stirling	"Hallelujah"	
re	January 16	Hillsong United	"Oceans (Where Feet May Fail)"†	
re	January 23	Hillsong United	"Oceans (Where Feet May Fail)"†	
re	January 30	Hillsong United	"Oceans (Where Feet May Fail)"†	
89	February 6	Chris Tomlin	"Good Good Father"	
89	February 13	Chris Tomlin	"Good Good Father"	
89	February 20	Chris Tomlin	"Good Good Father"	
89	February 27	Chris Tomlin	"Good Good Father"	
89	March 5	Chris Tomlin	"Good Good Father"	
89	March 12	Chris Tomlin	"Good Good Father"	
89	March 19	Chris Tomlin	"Good Good Father"	
90	March 26	Lauren Daigle	"Trust in You"	
90	April 2	Lauren Daigle	"Trust in You"	
90	April 9	Lauren Daigle	"Trust in You"	
90	April 16	Lauren Daigle	"Trust in You"	
90	April 23	Lauren Daigle	"Trust in You"	
90	April 30	Lauren Daigle	"Trust in You"	
90	May 7	Lauren Daigle	"Trust in You"	
90	May 14	Lauren Daigle	"Trust in You"	
90	May 21	Lauren Daigle	"Trust in You"	
90	May 28	Lauren Daigle	"Trust in You"	
90	June 4	Lauren Daigle	"Trust in You"	
90	June 11	Lauren Daigle	"Trust in You"	
90	June 18	Lauren Daigle	"Trust in You"	
90	June 25	Lauren Daigle	"Trust in You"	
90	July 2	Lauren Daigle	"Trust in You"	
90	July 9	Lauren Daigle	"Trust in You"	
90	July 16	Lauren Daigle	"Trust in You"	
90	July 23	Lauren Daigle	"Trust in You"	
91	July 30	Hillary Scott and The Scott Family	"Thy Will"	
92	August 6	Ryan Stevenson featuring GabeReal	"Eye of the Storm"	
re	August 13	Hillary Scott and The Scott Family	"Thy Will"	
re	August 20	Hillary Scott and The Scott Family	"Thy Will"	
re	August 27	Hillary Scott and The Scott Family	"Thy Will"	
re	September 3	Hillary Scott and The Scott Family	"Thy Will"	
re	September 10	Hillary Scott and The Scott Family	"Thy Will"	
re	September 17	Hillary Scott and The Scott Family	"Thy Will"	
re	September 24	Hillary Scott and The Scott Family	"Thy Will"	
re	October 1	Hillary Scott and The Scott Family	"Thy Will"	
re	October 8	Hillary Scott and The Scott Family	"Thy Will"	
re	October 15	Hillary Scott and The Scott Family	"Thy Will"	
re	October 22	Hillary Scott and The Scott Family	"Thy Will"	
re	October 29	Hillary Scott and The Scott Family	"Thy Will"	
re	November 5	Hillary Scott and The Scott Family	"Thy Will"	
re	November 12	Hillary Scott and The Scott Family	"Thy Will"	
93	November 19	Zach Williams	"Chain Breaker"	
93	November 26	Zach Williams	"Chain Breaker"	
93	December 3	Zach Williams	"Chain Breaker"	
93	December 10	Zach Williams	"Chain Breaker"	
94	December 17	Sundance Head	"Me and Jesus"	
95	December 24	Christian Cuevas	"To Worship You I Live (Away)"	
re	December 31	Sundance Head	"Me and Jesus"	
2017
96	January 7	Skillet	"Feel Invincible"	
re	January 14	Zach Williams	"Chain Breaker"	
re	January 21	Zach Williams	"Chain Breaker"	
re	January 28	Zach Williams	"Chain Breaker"	
re	February 4	Zach Williams	"Chain Breaker"	
re	February 11	Zach Williams	"Chain Breaker"	
97	February 18	Reba McEntire	"Back to God"	
98	February 25	Hillsong Worship	"What a Beautiful Name"†	
98	March 4	Hillsong Worship	"What a Beautiful Name"†	
98	March 11	Hillsong Worship	"What a Beautiful Name"†	
98	March 18	Hillsong Worship	"What a Beautiful Name"†	
98	March 25	Hillsong Worship	"What a Beautiful Name"†	
98	April 1	Hillsong Worship	"What a Beautiful Name"†	
98	April 8	Hillsong Worship	"What a Beautiful Name"†	
98	April 15	Hillsong Worship	"What a Beautiful Name"†	
99	April 22	MercyMe	"Even If"	
re	April 29	Hillsong Worship	"What a Beautiful Name"†	
re	May 6	Hillsong Worship	"What a Beautiful Name"†	
re	May 13	Hillsong Worship	"What a Beautiful Name"†	
re	May 20	Hillsong Worship	"What a Beautiful Name"†	
re	May 27	Hillsong Worship	"What a Beautiful Name"†	
re	June 3	Hillsong Worship	"What a Beautiful Name"†	
re	June 10	Hillsong Worship	"What a Beautiful Name"†	
re	June 17	Hillsong Worship	"What a Beautiful Name"†	
re	June 24	Hillsong Worship	"What a Beautiful Name"†	
100	July 1	Lecrae featuring Tori Kelly	"I'll Find You"	
re	July 8	MercyMe	"Even If"	
re	July 15	Hillsong Worship	"What a Beautiful Name"†	
re	July 22	Hillsong Worship	"What a Beautiful Name"†	
re	July 29	Hillsong Worship	"What a Beautiful Name"†	
re	August 5	Hillsong Worship	"What a Beautiful Name"†	
re	August 12	Hillsong Worship	"What a Beautiful Name"†	
re	August 19	Lecrae featuring Tori Kelly	"I'll Find You"	
re	August 26	Hillsong Worship	"What a Beautiful Name"†	
re	September 2	Hillsong Worship	"What a Beautiful Name"†	
re	September 9	Hillsong Worship	"What a Beautiful Name"†	
re	September 16	Lecrae featuring Tori Kelly	"I'll Find You"	
re	September 23	Lecrae featuring Tori Kelly	"I'll Find You"	
re	September 30	Hillsong Worship	"What a Beautiful Name"†	
101	October 7	NF	"Let You Down"	
re	October 14	Lecrae featuring Tori Kelly	"I'll Find You"	
re	October 21	Lecrae featuring Tori Kelly	"I'll Find You"	
re	October 28	Lecrae featuring Tori Kelly	"I'll Find You"	
re	November 4	Lecrae featuring Tori Kelly	"I'll Find You"	
re	November 11	Lecrae featuring Tori Kelly	"I'll Find You"	
re	November 18	Hillsong Worship	"What a Beautiful Name"†	
102	November 25	Zach Williams	"Old Church Choir"	
re	December 2	Hillsong Worship	"What a Beautiful Name"†	
re	December 9	Hillsong Worship	"What a Beautiful Name"†	
re	December 16	Hillsong Worship	"What a Beautiful Name"†	
103	December 23	Brooke Simpson	"Amazing Grace"	
re	December 30	Hillsong Worship	"What a Beautiful Name"†	
2018
104	January 3	Brooke Simpson	"O Holy Night"	
re	January 6	Hillsong Worship	"What a Beautiful Name"	
re	January 13	Hillsong Worship	"What a Beautiful Name"	
105	January 20	TobyMac	"I Just Need U."	
re	January 27	Hillsong Worship	"What a Beautiful Name"	
re	February 3	Hillsong Worship	"What a Beautiful Name"	
re	February 10	Hillsong Worship	"What a Beautiful Name"	
re	February 17	Hillsong Worship	"What a Beautiful Name"	
re	February 24	Hillsong Worship	"What a Beautiful Name"	
106	March 3	Cory Asbury	"Reckless Love"†	
106	March 10	Cory Asbury	"Reckless Love"†	
106	March 17	Cory Asbury	"Reckless Love"†	
106	March 24	Cory Asbury	"Reckless Love"†	
107	March 31	MercyMe	"I Can Only Imagine"	
107	April 7	MercyMe	"I Can Only Imagine"	
107	April 14	MercyMe	"I Can Only Imagine"	
re	April 21	Cory Asbury	"Reckless Love"†	
re	April 28	Cory Asbury	"Reckless Love"†	
re	May 5	Cory Asbury	"Reckless Love"†	
re	May 12	Cory Asbury	"Reckless Love"†	
re	May 19	Cory Asbury	"Reckless Love"†	
re	May 26	Cory Asbury	"Reckless Love"†	
re	June 2	Cory Asbury	"Reckless Love"†	
re	June 9	Cory Asbury	"Reckless Love"†	
re	June 16	Cory Asbury	"Reckless Love"†	
re	June 23	Cory Asbury	"Reckless Love"†	
re	June 30	Cory Asbury	"Reckless Love"†	
re	July 7	Cory Asbury	"Reckless Love"†	
re	July 14	Cory Asbury	"Reckless Love"†	
re	July 21	Cory Asbury	"Reckless Love"†	
108	July 28	Lauren Daigle	"You Say"	
108	August 4	Lauren Daigle	"You Say"	
108	August 11	Lauren Daigle	"You Say"	
108	August 18	Lauren Daigle	"You Say"	
108	August 25	Lauren Daigle	"You Say"	
108	September 1	Lauren Daigle	"You Say"	
108	September 8	Lauren Daigle	"You Say"	
108	September 15	Lauren Daigle	"You Say"	
108	September 22	Lauren Daigle	"You Say"	
108	September 29	Lauren Daigle	"You Say"	
108	October 6	Lauren Daigle	"You Say"	
108	October 13	Lauren Daigle	"You Say"	
108	October 20	Lauren Daigle	"You Say"	
108	October 27	Lauren Daigle	"You Say"	
108	November 3	Lauren Daigle	"You Say"	
108	November 10	Lauren Daigle	"You Say"	
108	November 17	Lauren Daigle	"You Say"	
108	November 24	Lauren Daigle	"You Say"	
108	December 1	Lauren Daigle	"You Say"	
108	December 8	Lauren Daigle	"You Say"	
108	December 15	Lauren Daigle	"You Say"	
108	December 22	Lauren Daigle	"You Say"	
108	December 29	Lauren Daigle	"You Say"	
2019
109	January 5	Lauren Daigle	"The Christmas Song"	
re	January 12	Lauren Daigle	"You Say"†	
re	January 19	Lauren Daigle	"You Say"†	
re	January 26	Lauren Daigle	"You Say"†	
re	February 2	Lauren Daigle	"You Say"†	
re	February 9	Lauren Daigle	"You Say"†	
re	February 16	Lauren Daigle	"You Say"†	
re	February 23	Lauren Daigle	"You Say"†	
re	March 2	Lauren Daigle	"You Say"†	
re	March 9	Lauren Daigle	"You Say"†	
re	March 16	Lauren Daigle	"You Say"†	
re	March 23	Lauren Daigle	"You Say"†	
re	March 30	Lauren Daigle	"You Say"†	
re	April 6	Lauren Daigle	"You Say"†	
re	April 13	Lauren Daigle	"You Say"†	
re	April 20	Lauren Daigle	"You Say"†	
re	April 27	Lauren Daigle	"You Say"†	
re	May 4	Lauren Daigle	"You Say"†	
re	May 11	Lauren Daigle	"You Say"†	
re	May 18	Lauren Daigle	"You Say"†	
re	May 25	Lauren Daigle	"You Say"†	
re	June 1	Lauren Daigle	"You Say"†	
re	June 8	Lauren Daigle	"You Say"†	
re	June 15	Lauren Daigle	"You Say"†	
re	June 22	Lauren Daigle	"You Say"†	
re	June 29	Lauren Daigle	"You Say"†	
re	July 6	Lauren Daigle	"You Say"†	
re	July 13	Lauren Daigle	"You Say"†	
re	July 20	Lauren Daigle	"You Say"†	
re	July 27	Lauren Daigle	"You Say"†	
re	August 3	Lauren Daigle	"You Say"†	
re	August 10	Lauren Daigle	"You Say"†	
re	August 17	Lauren Daigle	"You Say"†	
re	August 24	Lauren Daigle	"You Say"†	
re	August 31	Lauren Daigle	"You Say"†	
re	September 7	Lauren Daigle	"You Say"†	
re	September 14	Lauren Daigle	"You Say"†	
re	September 21	Lauren Daigle	"You Say"†	
re	September 28	Lauren Daigle	"You Say"†	
re	October 5	Lauren Daigle	"You Say"†	
re	October 12	Lauren Daigle	"You Say"†	
re	October 19	Lauren Daigle	"You Say"†	
re	October 26	Lauren Daigle	"You Say"†	
re	November 2	Lauren Daigle	"You Say"†	
110	November 9	Kanye West	"Follow God"	
110	November 16	Kanye West	"Follow God"	
110	November 23	Kanye West	"Follow God"	
110	November 30	Kanye West	"Follow God"	
110	December 7	Kanye West	"Follow God"	
110	December 14	Kanye West	"Follow God"	
110	December 21	Kanye West	"Follow God"	
110	December 28	Kanye West	"Follow God"	

=== Christian Airplay ===
No.	Issue Date	Artist	Single	Ref.
2013
79	December 7	Mandisa	"Overcomer"	
79	December 14	Mandisa	"Overcomer"	
80	December 21	tobyMac	"Speak Life"	
80	December 28	tobyMac	"Speak Life"	
2014
80	January 4	tobyMac	"Speak Life"	
80	January 11	tobyMac	"Speak Life"	
81	January 18	Big Daddy Weave	"The Only Name (Yours Will Be)"	
81	January 25	Big Daddy Weave	"The Only Name (Yours Will Be)"	
81	February 1	Big Daddy Weave	"The Only Name (Yours Will Be)"	
re	February 8	tobyMac	"Speak Life"	
re	February 15	Big Daddy Weave	"The Only Name (Yours Will Be)"	
re	February 22	Big Daddy Weave	"The Only Name (Yours Will Be)"	
82	March 1	Phil Wickham	"This Is Amazing Grace"†	
82	March 8	Phil Wickham	"This Is Amazing Grace"†	
82	March 15	Phil Wickham	"This Is Amazing Grace"†	
82	March 22	Phil Wickham	"This Is Amazing Grace"†	
82	March 29	Phil Wickham	"This Is Amazing Grace"†	
82	April 5	Phil Wickham	"This Is Amazing Grace"†	
82	April 12	Phil Wickham	"This Is Amazing Grace"†	
82	April 19	Phil Wickham	"This Is Amazing Grace"†	
82	April 26	Phil Wickham	"This Is Amazing Grace"†	
82	May 3	Phil Wickham	"This Is Amazing Grace"†	
83	May 10	Hillsong United	"Oceans (Where Feet May Fail)"	
84	May 17	Francesca Battistelli	"Write Your Story"	
85	May 24	Newsboys	"We Believe"	
85	May 31	Newsboys	"We Believe"	
85	June 7	Newsboys	"We Believe"	
85	June 14	Newsboys	"We Believe"	
85	June 21	Newsboys	"We Believe"	
85	June 28	Newsboys	"We Believe"	
85	July 5	Newsboys	"We Believe"	
85	July 12	Newsboys	"We Believe"	
85	July 19	Newsboys	"We Believe"	
85	July 26	Newsboys	"We Believe"	
85	August 2	Newsboys	"We Believe"	
85	August 9	Newsboys	"We Believe"	
85	August 16	Newsboys	"We Believe"	
85	August 23	Newsboys	"We Believe"	
86	August 30	Danny Gokey	"Hope in Front of Me"	
86	September 6	Danny Gokey	"Hope in Front of Me"	
86	September 13	Danny Gokey	"Hope in Front of Me"	
87	September 20	MercyMe	"Greater"	
88	September 27	For King & Country	"Fix My Eyes"	
re	October 4	MercyMe	"Greater"	
re	October 11	MercyMe	"Greater"	
re	October 18	MercyMe	"Greater"	
re	October 25	MercyMe	"Greater"	
re	November 1	MercyMe	"Greater"	
re	November 8	MercyMe	"Greater"	
re	November 15	MercyMe	"Greater"	
re	November 22	MercyMe	"Greater"	
re	November 29	MercyMe	"Greater"	
re	December 6	MercyMe	"Greater"	
re	December 13	MercyMe	"Greater"	
re	December 20	MercyMe	"Greater"	
re	December 27	MercyMe	"Greater"	
2015
re	January 3	MercyMe	"Greater"	
re	January 10	MercyMe	"Greater"	
89	January 17	Francesca Battistelli	"He Knows My Name"	
89	January 24	Francesca Battistelli	"He Knows My Name"	
89	January 31	Francesca Battistelli	"He Knows My Name"	
89	February 7	Francesca Battistelli	"He Knows My Name"	
89	February 14	Francesca Battistelli	"He Knows My Name"	
90	February 21	Chris Tomlin	"Jesus Loves Me"	
90	February 28	Chris Tomlin	"Jesus Loves Me"	
91	March 7	Jeremy Camp	"He Knows"	
91	March 14	Jeremy Camp	"He Knows"	
92	March 21	Crowder	"Come as You Are"	
92	March 28	Crowder	"Come as You Are"	
93	April 4	Matt Maher	"Because He Lives (Amen)"	
94	April 11	Third Day featuring All Sons & Daughters	"Soul on Fire"†	
94	April 18	Third Day featuring All Sons & Daughters	"Soul on Fire"†	
94	April 25	Third Day featuring All Sons & Daughters	"Soul on Fire"†	
94	May 2	Third Day featuring All Sons & Daughters	"Soul on Fire"†	
94	May 9	Third Day featuring All Sons & Daughters	"Soul on Fire"†	
94	May 16	Third Day featuring All Sons & Daughters	"Soul on Fire"†	
94	May 23	Third Day featuring All Sons & Daughters	"Soul on Fire"†	
94	May 30	Third Day featuring All Sons & Daughters	"Soul on Fire"†	
94	June 6	Third Day featuring All Sons & Daughters	"Soul on Fire"†	
94	June 13	Third Day featuring All Sons & Daughters	"Soul on Fire"†	
95	June 20	For King & Country	"Shoulders"	
95	June 27	For King & Country	"Shoulders"	
96	July 4	Francesca Battistelli	"Holy Spirit"	
96	July 11	Francesca Battistelli	"Holy Spirit"	
96	July 18	Francesca Battistelli	"Holy Spirit"	
96	July 25	Francesca Battistelli	"Holy Spirit"	
96	August 1	Francesca Battistelli	"Holy Spirit"	
97	August 8	MercyMe	"Flawless"	
97	August 15	MercyMe	"Flawless"	
97	August 22	MercyMe	"Flawless"	
97	August 29	MercyMe	"Flawless"	
97	September 5	MercyMe	"Flawless"	
97	September 12	MercyMe	"Flawless"	
97	September 19	MercyMe	"Flawless"	
97	September 26	MercyMe	"Flawless"	
98	October 3	Chris Tomlin	"At the Cross (Love Ran Red)"	
98	October 10	Chris Tomlin	"At the Cross (Love Ran Red)"	
re	October 17	MercyMe	"Flawless"	
99	October 24	Lauren Daigle	"First"	
99	October 31	Lauren Daigle	"First"	
99	November 7	Lauren Daigle	"First"	
re	November 14	MercyMe	"Flawless"	
100	November 21	Jeremy Camp	"Same Power"	
re	November 28	MercyMe	"Flawless"	
101	December 5	tobyMac featuring Mr. Talkbox	"Feel It"	
101	December 12	tobyMac featuring Mr. Talkbox	"Feel It"	
102	December 19	Big Daddy Weave	"My Story"	
103	December 26	Jordan Feliz	"The River"	
2016
103	January 2	Jordan Feliz	"The River"	
103	January 9	Jordan Feliz	"The River"	
103	January 16	Jordan Feliz	"The River"	
103	January 23	Jordan Feliz	"The River"	
103	January 30	Jordan Feliz	"The River"	
103	February 6	Jordan Feliz	"The River"	
103	February 13	Jordan Feliz	"The River"	
103	February 20	Jordan Feliz	"The River"	
103	February 27	Jordan Feliz	"The River"	
104	March 5	Chris Tomlin	"Good Good Father"	
105	March 12	Matthew West	"Grace Wins"	
105	March 19	Matthew West	"Grace Wins"	
105	March 26	Matthew West	"Grace Wins"	
106	April 2	Stars Go Dim	"You Are Loved"	
107	April 9	Lauren Daigle	"Trust in You"†	
107	April 16	Lauren Daigle	"Trust in You"†	
107	April 23	Lauren Daigle	"Trust in You"†	
107	April 30	Lauren Daigle	"Trust in You"†	
107	May 7	Lauren Daigle	"Trust in You"†	
107	May 14	Lauren Daigle	"Trust in You"†	
107	May 21	Lauren Daigle	"Trust in You"†	
107	May 28	Lauren Daigle	"Trust in You"†	
107	June 4	Lauren Daigle	"Trust in You"†	
108	June 11	Danny Gokey	"Tell Your Heart to Beat Again"	
109	June 18	7eventh Time Down	"God Is on the Move"	
109	June 25	7eventh Time Down	"God Is on the Move"	
109	July 2	7eventh Time Down	"God Is on the Move"	
109	July 9	7eventh Time Down	"God Is on the Move"	
109	July 16	7eventh Time Down	"God Is on the Move"	
110	July 23	Jeremy Camp	"Christ in Me"	
111	July 30	Ryan Stevenson featuring GabeReal	"Eye of the Storm"	
111	August 6	Ryan Stevenson featuring GabeReal	"Eye of the Storm"	
111	August 13	Ryan Stevenson featuring GabeReal	"Eye of the Storm"	
111	August 20	Ryan Stevenson featuring GabeReal	"Eye of the Storm"	
111	August 27	Ryan Stevenson featuring GabeReal	"Eye of the Storm"	
111	September 3	Ryan Stevenson featuring GabeReal	"Eye of the Storm"	
111	September 10	Ryan Stevenson featuring GabeReal	"Eye of the Storm"	
111	September 17	Ryan Stevenson featuring GabeReal	"Eye of the Storm"	
112	September 24	Hillary Scott and The Scott Family	"Thy Will"	
112	October 1	Hillary Scott and The Scott Family	"Thy Will"	
re	October 8	Ryan Stevenson featuring GabeReal	"Eye of the Storm"	
113	October 15	For King & Country	"Priceless"	
113	October 22	For King & Country	"Priceless"	
113	October 29	For King & Country	"Priceless"	
re	November 5	Hillary Scott and The Scott Family	"Thy Will"	
114	November 12	Zach Williams	"Chain Breaker"	
114	November 19	Zach Williams	"Chain Breaker"	
114	November 26	Zach Williams	"Chain Breaker"	
114	December 3	Zach Williams	"Chain Breaker"	
114	December 10	Zach Williams	"Chain Breaker"	
114	December 17	Zach Williams	"Chain Breaker"	
114	December 24	Zach Williams	"Chain Breaker"	
114	December 31	Zach Williams	"Chain Breaker"	
2017
115	January 7	Matt Maher	"Glory (Let There Be Peace)"	
re	January 14	Zach Williams	"Chain Breaker"	
re	January 21	Zach Williams	"Chain Breaker"	
re	January 28	Zach Williams	"Chain Breaker"	
re	February 4	Zach Williams	"Chain Breaker"	
re	February 11	Zach Williams	"Chain Breaker"	
re	February 18	Zach Williams	"Chain Breaker"	
re	February 25	Zach Williams	"Chain Breaker"	
116	March 4	Danny Gokey	"Rise"	
117	March 11	tobyMac	"Love Broke Thru"	
117	March 18	tobyMac	"Love Broke Thru"	
117	March 25	tobyMac	"Love Broke Thru"	
117	April 1	tobyMac	"Love Broke Thru"	
118	April 8	Hillsong Worship	"What a Beautiful Name"	
118	April 15	Hillsong Worship	"What a Beautiful Name"	
118	April 22	Hillsong Worship	"What a Beautiful Name"	
118	April 29	Hillsong Worship	"What a Beautiful Name"	
118	May 6	Hillsong Worship	"What a Beautiful Name"	
118	May 13	Hillsong Worship	"What a Beautiful Name"	
118	May 20	Hillsong Worship	"What a Beautiful Name"	
118	May 27	Hillsong Worship	"What a Beautiful Name"	
118	June 3	Hillsong Worship	"What a Beautiful Name"	
119	June 10	Chris Tomlin	"Home"	
119	June 17	Chris Tomlin	"Home"	
119	June 24	Chris Tomlin	"Home"	
120	July 1	MercyMe	"Even If"†	
120	July 8	MercyMe	"Even If"†	
120	July 15	MercyMe	"Even If"†	
120	July 22	MercyMe	"Even If"†	
120	July 29	MercyMe	"Even If"†	
120	August 5	MercyMe	"Even If"†	
120	August 12	MercyMe	"Even If"†	
120	August 19	MercyMe	"Even If"†	
121	August 26	Zach Williams	"Old Church Choir"	
121	September 2	Zach Williams	"Old Church Choir"	
121	September 9	Zach Williams	"Old Church Choir"	
121	September 16	Zach Williams	"Old Church Choir"	
121	September 23	Zach Williams	"Old Church Choir"	
121	September 30	Zach Williams	"Old Church Choir"	
121	October 7	Zach Williams	"Old Church Choir"	
121	October 14	Zach Williams	"Old Church Choir"	
121	October 21	Zach Williams	"Old Church Choir"	
121	October 28	Zach Williams	"Old Church Choir"	
121	November 4	Zach Williams	"Old Church Choir"	
121	November 11	Zach Williams	"Old Church Choir"	
122	November 18	Matthew West	"Broken Things"	
re	November 25	Zach Williams	"Old Church Choir"	
re	December 2	Zach Williams	"Old Church Choir"	
re	December 9	Zach Williams	"Old Church Choir"	
re	December 16	Zach Williams	"Old Church Choir"	
re	December 23	Zach Williams	"Old Church Choir"	
re	December 30	Zach Williams	"Old Church Choir"	
2018
123	January 3	Francesca Battistelli	"Messiah"	
re	January 6	Zach Williams	"Old Church Choir"	
re	January 13	Zach Williams	"Old Church Choir"	
124	January 20	Tenth Avenue North	"Control (Somehow You Want Me)"	
124	January 27	Tenth Avenue North	"Control (Somehow You Want Me)"	
125	February 3	Lauren Daigle	"O'Lord"	
re	February 10	Tenth Avenue North	"Control (Somehow You Want Me)"	
re	February 17	Tenth Avenue North	"Control (Somehow You Want Me)"	
re	February 24	Tenth Avenue North	"Control (Somehow You Want Me)"	
re	March 3	Tenth Avenue North	"Control (Somehow You Want Me)"	
re	March 10	Tenth Avenue North	"Control (Somehow You Want Me)"	
126	March 17	Crowder featuring Tauren Wells	"All My Hope"	
126	March 24	Crowder featuring Tauren Wells	"All My Hope"	
127	March 31	tobyMac	"I Just Need U."	
127	April 7	tobyMac	"I Just Need U."	
128	April 14	Cory Asbury	"Reckless Love"†	
128	April 21	Cory Asbury	"Reckless Love"†	
128	April 28	Cory Asbury	"Reckless Love"†	
128	May 5	Cory Asbury	"Reckless Love"†	
128	May 12	Cory Asbury	"Reckless Love"†	
128	May 19	Cory Asbury	"Reckless Love"†	
128	May 26	Cory Asbury	"Reckless Love"†	
128	June 2	Cory Asbury	"Reckless Love"†	
128	June 9	Cory Asbury	"Reckless Love"†	
128	June 16	Cory Asbury	"Reckless Love"†	
128	June 23	Cory Asbury	"Reckless Love"†	
128	June 30	Cory Asbury	"Reckless Love"†	
128	July 7	Cory Asbury	"Reckless Love"†	
129	July 14	MercyMe	"Grace Got You"	
129	July 21	MercyMe	"Grace Got You"	
129	July 28	MercyMe	"Grace Got You"	
129	August 4	MercyMe	"Grace Got You"	
129	August 11	MercyMe	"Grace Got You"	
130	August 18	For King & Country	"Joy."	
130	August 25	For King & Country	"Joy."	
130	September 1	For King & Country	"Joy."	
130	September 8	For King & Country	"Joy."	
131	September 15	Lauren Daigle	"You Say"	
131	September 22	Lauren Daigle	"You Say"	
131	September 29	Lauren Daigle	"You Say"	
131	October 6	Lauren Daigle	"You Say"	
131	October 13	Lauren Daigle	"You Say"	
131	October 20	Lauren Daigle	"You Say"	
131	October 27	Lauren Daigle	"You Say"	
131	November 3	Lauren Daigle	"You Say"	
131	November 10	Lauren Daigle	"You Say"	
131	November 17	Lauren Daigle	"You Say"	
131	November 24	Lauren Daigle	"You Say"	
131	December 1	Lauren Daigle	"You Say"	
131	December 8	Lauren Daigle	"You Say"	
131	December 15	Lauren Daigle	"You Say"	
132	December 22	Tauren Wells	"Known"	
re	December 29	Lauren Daigle	"You Say"	
2019
re	January 5	Lauren Daigle	"You Say"	
re	January 12	Lauren Daigle	"You Say"	
133	January 19	Hillsong Worship	"Who You Say I Am"	
133	January 26	Hillsong Worship	"Who You Say I Am"	
re	February 2	Tauren Wells	"Known"	
134	February 9	Casting Crowns	"Only Jesus"	
134	February 16	Casting Crowns	"Only Jesus"	
134	February 23	Casting Crowns	"Only Jesus"	
134	March 2	Casting Crowns	"Only Jesus"	
135	March 9	MercyMe	"Best News Ever"	
135	March 16	MercyMe	"Best News Ever"	
135	March 23	MercyMe	"Best News Ever"	
135	March 30	MercyMe	"Best News Ever"	
135	April 6	MercyMe	"Best News Ever"	
136	April 13	For King & Country	"God Only Knows"†	
136	April 20	For King & Country	"God Only Knows"†	
136	April 27	For King & Country	"God Only Knows"†	
136	May 4	For King & Country	"God Only Knows"†	
136	May 11	For King & Country	"God Only Knows"†	
136	May 18	For King & Country	"God Only Knows"†	
136	May 25	For King & Country	"God Only Knows"†	
137	June 1	Pat Barrett	"Build My Life"	
re	June 8	For King & Country	"God Only Knows"	
re	June 15	For King & Country	"God Only Knows"	
re	June 22	For King & Country	"God Only Knows"	
138	June 29	Danny Gokey	"Haven't Seen It Yet"	
138	July 6	Danny Gokey	"Haven't Seen It Yet"	
138	July 13	Danny Gokey	"Haven't Seen It Yet"	
138	July 20	Danny Gokey	"Haven't Seen It Yet"	
138	July 27	Danny Gokey	"Haven't Seen It Yet"	
139	August 3	Big Daddy Weave	"Alive"	
139	August 10	Big Daddy Weave	"Alive"	
140	August 17	Unspoken	"Reason"	
141	August 24	Bethel Music, Jonathan David Helser and Melissa Helser	"Raise a Hallelujah"	
141	August 31	Bethel Music, Jonathan David Helser and Melissa Helser	"Raise a Hallelujah"	
re	September 7	Unspoken	"Reason"	
re	September 14	Unspoken	"Reason"	
re	September 21	Unspoken	"Reason"	
re	September 28	Unspoken	"Reason"	
142	October 5	Casting Crowns featuring Matthew West	"Nobody"	
142	October 12	Casting Crowns featuring Matthew West	"Nobody"	
142	October 19	Casting Crowns featuring Matthew West	"Nobody"	
142	October 26	Casting Crowns featuring Matthew West	"Nobody"	
142	November 2	Casting Crowns featuring Matthew West	"Nobody"	
142	November 9	Casting Crowns featuring Matthew West	"Nobody"	
142	November 16	Casting Crowns featuring Matthew West	"Nobody"	
142	November 23	Casting Crowns featuring Matthew West	"Nobody"	
142	November 30	Casting Crowns featuring Matthew West	"Nobody"	
142	December 7	Casting Crowns featuring Matthew West	"Nobody"	
142	December 14	Casting Crowns featuring Matthew West	"Nobody"	
142	December 21	Casting Crowns featuring Matthew West	"Nobody"	
142	December 28	Casting Crowns featuring Matthew West	"Nobody"	

== See also ==
- List of number-one Billboard Christian Songs of the 2000s
