= The Generous Mr. Lovewell =

Studio album by MercyMe
- Released: May 4, 2010
- Recorded: 2009–2010 in the United States (Note: According to the inner liner notes of the album.): Sonic Ranch (El Paso, Texas, US); Quad Studios (Nashville, Tennessee, US)
- Genres: Christian rock; alternative rock; pop rock
- Length: 43:07
- Label: INO
- Producers: Brown Bannister; Dan Muckala

MercyMe chronology
10 (2009)	The Generous Mr. Lovewell (2010)	The Worship Sessions (2011)

Singles from The Generous Mr. Lovewell
- 1. "All of Creation" Released: January 29, 2010; 2. "Beautiful" Released: September 17, 2010; 3. "Move" Released: May 23, 2011

The Generous Mr. Lovewell is the sixth studio album by Christian rock band MercyMe. Released in May 2010, the album is a concept record revolving around a fictional, allegorical character, 'Mr. Lovewell', and the overall theme of love. Produced by Brown Bannister and Dan Muckala, the album met with positive critical and commercial reception. The album sold over 88,000 copies its first week and debuted at number three on the Billboard 200 and at number one on the Christian Albums chart.

Three singles were released in promotion of the album, all of them reaching number one on Billboard's Christian Songs chart. Lead single "All of Creation" spent ten weeks at the top of the Christian Songs chart, also peaking at No. 14 on the Heatseekers Songs chart and No. 2 on the Bubbling Under Hot 100 Singles chart. "Beautiful" and "Move" also reached number one on the Christian Songs chart, holding the top spot for one and nine weeks, respectively, with "Move" also peaking at No. 20 on the Bubbling Under Hot 100 Singles chart.

This was also the last MercyMe album to feature founding member Jim Bryson.

== Background, concept, and recording ==
The idea for the character of "Mr. Lovewell" and the album came up while the band was attempting to figure out concepts for the record. According to lead singer Bart Millard "we [MercyMe] were trying to come up with the concept for our next record. For some reason, the words 'love well' got stuck in my head". Millard elaborated that "we're very good, as a nation, at loving well when a massive tragedy takes place... We all of a sudden become very unified, which is a great, great thing. But on a day-to-day basis, we pass up opportunities. We look the other way, or we try to ignore. So the idea of loving well is almost a kind of 'pay it forward' that revolves around the cross". With that general idea, MercyMe was going to name the album Love Well. However, the band decided to make a character that personifies the idea of 'loving well', and came up with the character of 'Mr. Lovewell', partly inspired by The Beatles' 1967 album Sgt. Pepper's Lonely Hearts Club Band. Because of the character and the more diverse sound the album was going to have, the band felt the original name didn't fit and changed the album name to reflect the character of 'Mr. Lovewell'. Millard has described the character of 'Mr. Lovewell' as "like Buddy the Elf meets Forrest Gump. He sees the good in everyone and knows his neighbors enough to know their needs. Mr. Lovewell may not be the next Billy Graham, but he’s changing the world each day in every little word and deed.”

The concept of 'loving well' was further developed when the band made a trip to the Dominican Republic and were inspired by the resilient spirits of people living in poverty on the island. When the band started to write the songs for the album, they joined the character of 'Mr. Lovewell' and the concept of 'loving well', creating the overall message of love that is present in the album. Millard stated the band's dream for the album was "to inspire others to ‘pay it forward’ to the cross. It doesn’t have to be about major sacrifices. Just let your life become such that people know what you stand for".

The album was recorded mostly by Reid Shippen at Sonic Ranch in El Paso, Texas, with the exceptions of "Won't You Be My Love" and "All of Creation", which were recorded by Steve Bishir at Quad Studios. (Note: According to the inner liner notes of the album.)

== Composition ==
All of Creation
A sample of the "All of Creation", the album's lead single.

The Generous Mr. Lovewell
A sample of the album's title track, which has been described as resembling the sound of The Beatles.

Move
A sample of the "Move", a dance-rock song.

=== Music ===
MercyMe wanted to get out of their comfort zone with the overall sound of the album, and brought in producer Dan Muckala. Millard has said that he initially wrote the songs on the album as poems and then the band worked on the music, meaning the band didn't think much about the overall length of the songs. MercyMe further developed the sound of the album by looking to the work of The Beatles for inspiration.

The songs on the album often vary in genre, with many falling outside of MercyMe's usual adult contemporary sound. Songs on the album take influences from many genres, including electronic rock on "This Life" and dance music/dance-rock on "Move". "All of Creation", "Only You Remain", and "Won't You Be My Love" have a more general worship or Adult Contemporary feel, while the title track takes a musical feel similar to that of The Beatles.

=== Lyrics ===
The album's lyrical content generally revolves around a theme of unconditional love and a concept MercyMe has called 'loving well'. Other lyrical themes include worship and selflessness.

Individual songs vary on the overall theme of love. "Beautiful" was written for the daughters of the band members, expressing the Christian viewpoint that Jesus saw something beautiful, something worth dying for, in everyone. "This So Called Love" expresses the belief that all good deeds done absent of Jesus are in vain.

== Critical reception ==
Professional ratings
Review scores
Source	Rating
AllMusic	4.5/5 stars
Billboard	4.5/5 stars
CCM Magazine	4/5 stars
Christianity Today	3/5 stars
Christian Music Review	A+
Cross Rhythms	10/10 stars
Jesus Freak Hideout	3/5 stars
New Release Today	5/5 stars
Plugged In (publication)	(positive)
USA Today	3/4 stars

Critical reception to The Generous Mr. Lovewell was generally positive. Giving the album four-and-a-half out of five stars, Allmusic reviewer Jared Johnson stated "If you only know MercyMe for their 2001 ubiquitous AC crossover hit "I Can Only Imagine," you've missed out on some of the Christian genre's most accessible and well-known hits – which means you might not fully appreciate the full artistic statement that the band makes on The Generous Mr. Lovewell, a daring reinvention that drove the band far outside its comfort zone and sparked a national social trend in the process," also noting that "the band's collaboration with Brown Bannister and Dan Muckala delivers the messages with authenticity and contemporary new sounds that make it perfectly believable to envision a world in which Lovewell's considerate and genuine actions are manifest in the lives of real everyday people". Kevin Davis of Christian Music Review, giving the album an A+, opined that the album reminds him "of a classic theme album like Sgt. Pepper by The Beatles or Songs For Jane [sic] by Maroon 5, both in musical diversity and with the challenging lyrics" and "truly establishes MercyMe as the premier artist in all of Christian music".

Kevin McNeese of NewReleaseTuesday gave the album five out of five stars, opining that "[The Generous Mr. Lovewell] takes the formula that MercyMe has perfected and drop kicks it out of Mr. Lovewell's window". Roger Gelwicks of Jesus Freak Hideout was even less positive, opining that "MercyMe is still on top of their game... however, The Generous Mr. Lovewell is undeniably a pretty forgettable record, and while there are a few gems to be found, it's only going to appeal to the already-existent fanbase MercyMe has garnered after all these years", also stating that "MercyMe still has great things to say and their musical progression has been adequate enough, but it's hard to see their sixth record as anything extraordinary and more desirable than their previous material." Billboard reviewer Deborah Evans Price commented that "from the buoyant opener "This Life" to the brief but eloquent closer "This So Called Love," MercyMe's sixth studio album, "The Generous Mr. Lovewell," is a beautifully executed set that celebrates how the power of love can change the world... Music with a message has never sounded lovelier".

=== Accolades ===
At the 2011 Billboard Music Awards, The Generous Mr. Lovewell was nominated for Top Christian Album and "All of Creation" was nominated for Top Christian Song. At the 42nd GMA Dove Awards, "All of Creation" was nominated for Song of the Year and Pop/Contemporary Recorded Song of the Year.

== Release and promotion ==
"The Generous Mr. Lovewell" debuted at number 3 on the Billboard 200 with 88,000 copies sold in its first week of release. This marked both a record sales week for the band as well as their highest chart peak to date. 80% of the album's sales came from Christian retailers. The album also debuted at number 1 on the Christian Albums chart. The high first week sales totals were led by a lengthy pre-order campaign. Accordingly, album sales slid sharply in its second week, with the album selling 18,000 units (an 80% sales drop) and sliding 20 spots, to number 23 on the Billboard 200. The Generous Mr. Lovewell spent a total of six weeks atop the Christian Albums chart during its run. It ranked as the sixth best-selling Christian album of 2010, the seventh best-selling Christian album of 2011, and the 47th best-selling Christian album of 2012. It was certified Gold by the Recording Industry Association of America (RIAA) on May 15, 2015, signifying shipments of over 500,000 copies.

Three singles were released from The Generous Mr. Lovewell. The album's first single, "All of Creation", was released to radio of January 29, 2010. On March 2, 2010 it was released as a digital download on iTunes and as a CD single at select Walmart locations. It spent nine weeks atop the Billboard Christian Songs chart and peaked at number 11 on the Billboard Bubbling Under Hot 100 Singles chart. "All of Creation" was ranked by Billboard at the top spot on the 2010 year-end Christian Songs chart. "Beautiful", was released on September 17, 2010 as the album's second single, and spent one week atop the Christian Songs chart. "Move" was released as the album's third single. It spent nine weeks atop the Christian Songs chart and peaked at number 20 on the Bubbling Under Hot 100 Singles chart.

== Track listing ==
All tracks are written by MercyMe and Dan Muckala except where noted.

No.	Title	Writer(s)	Length
1.	"This Life"		3:44
2.	"The Generous Mr. Lovewell"	MercyMe	4:10
3.	"Move"		2:58
4.	"Crazy Enough"	MercyMe	4:07
5.	"All of Creation"		3:56
6.	"Beautiful"		4:22
7.	"Back to You"		4:11
8.	"Only You Remain"	MercyMe, Dan Muckala, Jason Ingram	4:51
9.	"Free"	MercyMe, Muckala, Ingram	4:09
10.	"Won't You Be My Love"	Thad Cockrell, Nick Kish, Bart Millard	5:16
11.	"This So Called Love"	Millard	1:36
Total length:			43:07

== Personnel ==
Credits adapted from AllMusic

MercyMe (Note: The band members' instruments are not credited on the album's liner notes, aside from crediting backing vocals and being part of the band. Their primary instruments are listed based on their accounts of their de facto primary roles in the group.)

- Bart Millard – lead vocals, backing vocals
- Jim Bryson – keyboards, backing vocals
- Barry Graul – guitars, backing vocals
- Mike Scheuchzer – guitars, backing vocals
- Nathan Cochran – bass, backing vocals
- Robby Shaffer – drums

Additional Performers

- Dan Muckala – programming, backing vocals
- Chuck Butler – musician
- Adam Lester – musician
- Carly Bannister – backing vocals
- Thad Cockrell – backing vocals
- Matt Fuqua – backing vocals
- Josh Havens – backing vocals
- Ellie Holcomb – backing vocals
- Dan Ostebo – backing vocals

Production and Technical

- Brown Bannister – producer, overdub recording, digital editing
- Dan Muckala – producer, overdub recording, digital editing
- F. Reid Shippen – recording (1–4, 6–9, 11), mixing
- Steve Bishir – recording (5, 10)
- Aaron Chmielewski – recording assistant (1–4, 6–9, 11)
- Dan Deurloo – recording assistant (1–4, 6–9, 11), digital editing
- Charles Godfrey – recording assistant (1–4, 6–9, 11)
- Buckley Miller – recording assistant (1–4, 6–9, 11)
- Bill Whittington – overdub recording, digital editing
- Chuck Butler – digital editing
- Erik "Keller" Jahner – mix assistant
- Ted Jensen – mastering
- David Edmonson – photography
- Luke Edmonson – photography
- Brody Harper – art direction, cover design
- Ben McCraw – package design
- Kristin Weidemann – artwork
- Leigh Ragan – hair stylist, make-up
- Danielle Kelley – casting
- Daniel Martin – casting

Additional Studios

- Overdubbed at Townsend Sound Studios and Glomo Studio (Nashville, Tennessee).
- Mixed at Robot Lemon (Nashville, Tennessee).
- Mastered at Sterling Sound (New York City, New York).

== Chart positions ==
Weekly album charts
Chart (2010)	Peak position
US Billboard 200	3
US Christian Albums (Billboard)	1
Chart (2012)	Peak position
US Catalog Albums (Billboard)	12

Weekly single charts
Year	Song	Peak chart positions	
Year	Song	US	US Christ
2010	"All of Creation"	— (Note: "All of Creation" did not appear on the Hot 100, but peaked at number 11 on Bubbling Under Hot 100 Singles chart. It also peaked at number 8 on the component Hot Singles Sales chart.)	1
2010	"Beautiful"	—	1
2011	"Move"	— (Note: "Move" did not appear on the Hot 100, but peaked at number 20 on Bubbling Under Hot 100 Singles chart.)	1

Year-end charts
Chart (2010)	Peak position
US Billboard 200	158
US Christian Albums (Billboard)	6
Chart (2011)	Peak position
US Christian Albums (Billboard)	7
Chart (2012)	Peak position
US Christian Albums (Billboard)	47

== Certifications ==
Certifications
Country	Certification	Units shipped
United States	Gold	500,000
