= Beautiful (MercyMe song) =

Single by MercyMe

from the album The Generous Mr. Lovewell
- Released: September 17, 2010
- Recorded: 2009–2010 in the United States: Sonic Ranch (El Paso, Texas) (Note: According to the inner liner notes of the album.)
- Genre: Contemporary Christian
- Length: 4:21
- Label: INO
- Songwriters: Brown Bannister, James Bryson, Nathan Cochran, Barry Graul, Bart Millard, Dan Muckala, Michael John Scheuchzer, Robin Shaffer
- Producers: Bannister; Muckala

MercyMe singles chronology
"All of Creation" (2010)	"Beautiful" (2010)	"Move" (2011)

"Beautiful" is a song by contemporary Christian music band MercyMe. Written and composed by MercyMe, Dan Muckala, and Brown Bannister, the song was written for the daughters of the band's members. The song's lyrics revolve around self-worth and the love of God. "Beautiful" was released on September 17, 2010, as the second single from MercyMe's 2010 album The Generous Mr. Lovewell.

"Beautiful" received generally mixed to positive reviews from critics and attained success on Christian radio, peaking at the top spot on Billboard magazine's Christian Songs, Christian AC Indicator, Christian AC Monitored, and Soft AC/Inspo charts. "Beautiful" ranked at number 7 on the 2011 year-end Christian Songs chart, as well as at number 10 on the 2011 year-end Hot Christian AC chart.

== Background and composition ==
Beautiful
A sample of the second verse and chorus of "Beautiful", which lyrically relates to the love of God.

"Beautiful" was written and composed by the members of MercyMe, Dan Muckala, and Brown Bannister. (Note: According to the inner liner notes of the album.) "Beautiful" was written for the daughters of MercyMe's band members. Lead singer Bart Millard, in an interview with Kevin Davis of New Release Tuesday, stated that "We [MercyMe] wrote the song with our daughters in mind. The band has 15 kids among all of us... Satan targets our girls from a materialistic way, telling them how to act and how to look, what to eat and not to eat", also commenting that "I try to tell my kids all the time that they are perfect and I know my daughters need to get their confidence in themselves from me. The way they want to be treated by men needs to come from me".

"Beautiful" is a ballad with a length of four minutes and twenty-one seconds. It is set in the key of G major and has a moderate tempo of 69 beats per minute, with a vocal range spanning from D_{4}-B_{5}. Lyrically, the song is about self-worth and the love of God, specifically aimed at young women and daughters. However, the song also has a broader theme; Millard noted in an interview that "All of us have felt unlovable at some point. At times, I feel worthless. I have an argument with a friend, all that I’ve come to like about myself is suddenly falling apart. Who can love me if I don’t even like myself? It’s hard to drag ourselves out of this way of thinking. We are taught to live according to these expectations. We think we need approval and accomplishment to validate our lives. But what does God tell us? He says, “You’re beautiful. You are made for so much more than all of this.” He loves us, even in our failings".

== Reception ==
=== Critical response ===
Critical reception to "Beautiful" was generally mixed to positive. Andy Argyrakis of Today's Christian Music commented on his review of The Generous Mr. Lovewell that "Of course, there's the token ballad or two, including "Beautiful" and "Won't You Be My Love," both of which are sure to further MercyMe's radio domination, while providing a soothing and tender touch to the plugged in periods". Kevin Davis of Christian Music Review opined that "Having three young daughters, I’m extremely moved by the passion behind the lyrics speaking of how the world says we are never good enough, yet Christ saw something beautiful in us worth dying for". Jesus Freak Hideout reviewer Roger Gelwicks was less positive, commenting that the song (along with an album cut, "Free") "lack[s] anything to be held onto musically, and they do tend to drag on for too long and therefore bore the listener".

=== Chart performance ===
"Beautiful" debuted at number 42 for the chart week of October 2, 2010 on the Billboard Christian Songs chart. The song advanced to number 22 in its second chart week, and to number 15 in its sixth chart week. The song advanced to number 10 the next week, and spent four weeks at number 9 (from weeks eight to eleven) before dropping back to number 10 in its twelfth chart week. "Beautiful" dropped to number 16 for the chart week of January 8, 2011 (its fifteenth week on the chart), but advanced to number 6 the following week and spent two consecutive weeks at that spot. Starting with the chart week of February 18, 2011, the song spent four consecutive weeks at number 2 before advancing to the top spot in its twenty-fifth chart week. "Beautiful" held the top spot for one week (the chart week of March 19, 2011) before dropping to number 5. The song spent fourteen more weeks on the chart before dropping out, having spent a total of forty weeks on the Christian Songs chart.

"Beautiful" also peaked at the top spot on the Christian AC Indicator, Christian AC Monitored, and Soft AC/INSPO charts. "Beautiful" ranked at number 45 on Billboard magazine's 2010 year-end Christian Songs chart; it also ranked at number 7 on the 2011 year-end Christian Songs chart, number 10 on the year-end Hot Christian AC chart, and number 27 on the year-end Christian Digital Songs chart.

== Other uses ==
"Beautiful" was included on the compilation album WOW Hits 2012.

== Music video ==
MercyMe in the music video for "Beautiful"

A music video was released for "Beautiful". The video features the band performing the song in a live concert setting.

== Charts ==
=== Weekly charts ===
Chart (2010–2011)	Peak position
Billboard Christian Songs	1
Billboard Christian AC Indicator	1
Billboard Christian AC Monitored	1
Billboard Soft AC/Inspo	1

=== Year-end charts ===
Chart (2010)	Position
Billboard Hot Christian Songs	45
Chart (2011)	Position
Billboard Christian Songs	7
Billboard Hot Christian AC	10
Billboard Christian Digital Songs	27

== See also ==
- List of number-one Billboard Christian Songs of the 2010s
