= The Hurt & the Healer (song) =

Single by MercyMe

from the album The Hurt & the Healer
- Released: February 28, 2012
- Recorded: 2011
- Genre: Christian rock, adult contemporary
- Length: 4:52
- Label: Fair Trade
- Songwriters: James Bryson, Nathan Cochran, Barry Graul, Bart Millard, Michael John Scheuchzer, Robin Shaffer
- Producers: Brown Bannister, Dan Muckala

MercyMe singles chronology
"Move" (2011)	"The Hurt & the Healer" (2012)	"You Are I Am" (2012)

"The Hurt & the Healer" is a song by Christian rock band MercyMe. Written by Bart Millard, Robby Shaffer, Jim Bryson, Mike Schuechzer, Nathan Cochran, and Barry Graul, it was released as the lead single from the band's upcoming album of the same title. The idea for the song came after the death of Millard's firefighter cousin, who died while fighting a fire, and the song's early completion resulted in the album being pushed back so that the band could make sure the rest of the album "held its own".

"The Hurt & the Healer" was released to radio and as a digital download on February 28, 2012, and has peaked inside the top ten on several Christian chart formats and inside the top fifteen on the Billboard Christian CHR chart.

== Background ==
The idea for "The Hurt & the Healer" came from several difficult experiences the band dealt with in 2011, particularly the death of lead singer Bart Millard's cousin Todd Krodle, which was the source of great deal of grief for the band. Krodle, a firefighter killed in the line of duty, was a friend of all the members of MercyMe and also a Christian; his death, according to the band's bassist Nathan Cochran, "was a moment of extreme pain for everybody". Cochran said that "The Hurt & the Healer" helped the band to work through their grief. Millard described the song as having come out of the whole moment of his cousin's death and said that "I've lost loved ones, and I've hurt probably as much as most people, but being so close to him, I helped play a role in getting the family that he left behind through the hard times. It gave me a chance to kind of be part of the healing process. And you'd think it's something you do all the time, but that close to home, to hurt like I lost a brother and to still kind of pick up the pieces is something that I don't think anybody really gets used to". He described the idea of the song as being "that you feel more alive when the hurt and the healer collide".

According to Millard, "The Hurt & The Healer" was finished early and resulted in their album of the same title being pushed back. The band felt the response to the song was bigger than they expected and that it "raised the bar" for the rest of the album. They decided to "make sure the rest of the record [held] its own", an experience Millard described as "a good thing".

== Recording and composition ==
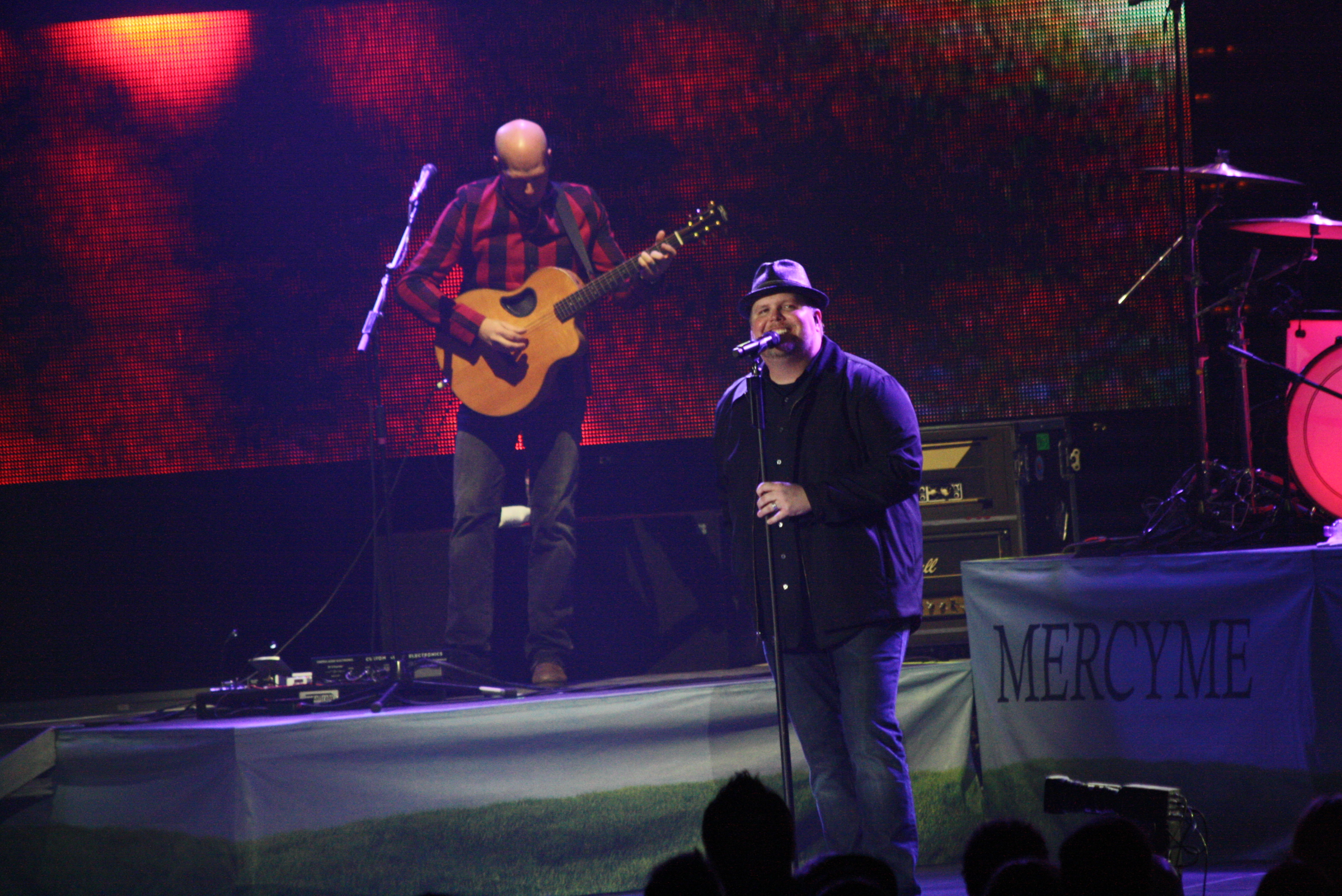
Graul and Millard

"The Hurt & The Healer" was written by Bart Millard, Robby Shaffer, Jim Bryson, Mike Schuechzer, Nahtan Cochran, and Barry Graul. It was produced by Brown Bannister and Dan Muckala. It is a Christian rock song with a length of four minutes and fifty-two seconds. It is set in common time in the key of A major with a tempo of 66 beats per minute. Bart Millard's vocals in the song range from the low note of E_{4} to the high note of A_{5}. Cochran has described the song's lyrics as being "about going to heaven and being with the Lord ... It’s a song that deals with coming out with pain and loss and coming out with hope".

== Release and chart performance ==
On January 30, 2012, MercyMe posted an audio link for "The Hurt & The Healer" on their official website for 24 hours, giving fans an opportunity to listen to the song before its official release. It was released as a digital download on February 28, 2012, and was released to Christian AC, Christian CHR, and Soft AC/Inspirational radio formats on that same date. LifeWay Christian Resources included a CD single of "The Hurt & The Healer" as part of a pre-order offer.

On the Billboard Hot Christian Songs chart, "The Hurt & The Healer" debuted at No. 48 for the chart week of March 3, 2012. In its second chart week the song advanced to No. 18, and in its sixth week it advanced to No. 8. In its ninth week, "The Hurt & The Healer" advanced to its current peak position of No. 3. It has also peaked at No. 1 on the Billboard Soft AC/Inspirational chart, No. 1 on the Billboard Christian AC Indicator chart, No. 1 on the Billboard Hot Christian AC chart, and No. 8 on the Billboard Christian CHR chart.

== Chart performance ==
=== Weekly charts ===
Chart (2012)	Peak position
Billboard Christian AC Indicator	1
Billboard Christian CHR	8
Billboard Hot Christian AC	1
Billboard Hot Christian Songs	1
Billboard Soft AC/Inspirational	1

== Release history ==
Date	Format	Label
February 28, 2012	Digital single	Fair Trade
February 28, 2012	Christian AC radio	Fair Trade
February 28, 2012	Christian CHR radio	Fair Trade
February 28, 2012	Soft AC/Inspirational radio	Fair Trade
