= 2011 Billboard Music Awards =

Annual American music awards ceremony

- Date: May 22, 2011
- Location: MGM Grand Garden Arena, Las Vegas, Nevada, U.S.
- Hosted by: Ken Jeong

Highlights
- Most awards: Eminem and Justin Bieber (6 each)
- Most nominations: Rihanna (18)

Television/radio coverage
- Network: ABC

The 2011 Billboard Music Awards were held May 22, 2011 at the MGM Grand Garden Arena in Las Vegas, Nevada and hosted by Ken Jeong. The awards recognized the most popular artists and albums from 2010.

== Performances ==
Artist(s)	Song(s)
Rihanna; Britney Spears	"S&M"
The Black Eyed Peas	"Just Can't Get Enough" "The Time (Dirty Bit)" "Boom Boom Pow" "I Gotta Feeling"
Keith Urban	"Long Hot Summer"
Pitbull; Nayer; Ne-Yo	"Give Me Everything"
Beyoncé	"Run the World (Girls)"
CeeLo Green; Mikky Ekko	"Crazy" "Bright Lights Bigger City" "Forget You"
Lady Antebellum	"Just a Kiss"
Taio Cruz	"Break Your Heart" "Dynamite"
OneRepublic; Far East Movement; Snoop Dogg	"Good Life" "Rocketeer" "Like a G6" "If I Was You (OMG)"
Mary J. Blige; Lil Wayne	"Someone to Love Me (Naked)"
Kesha	"Animal" "Blow"
Nicki Minaj; Britney Spears	"Super Bass" "Till the World Ends"
Neil Diamond	"Sweet Caroline" "America"

== Presenters ==
- Matthew Morrison — presented Billboard 200 Album Artist of the Year
- Eric Stonestreet — presented Digital Artist of the Year
- Kylie Minogue — introduced the Black Eyed Peas
- the cast of The Hangover — introduced Keith Urban
- Randy Jackson — presented Hot 100 Song of the Year
- Nas — introduced Pitbull, Nayer and Ne-Yo
- Tim Allen — presented Country Song of the Year
- Tina Knowles — presented the Millennium Award to Beyoncé
- Selena Gomez & Rico Rodriguez — presented Top Duo/Group
- Kelly Rowland & Trey Songz — introduced and presented the Innovator Award to CeeLo Green
- Joe Jonas — presented Radio Artist of the Year
- Apolo Ohno — introduced Taio Cruz
- Snoop Dogg & The Far East Movement — presented Top New Artist of the Year
- Keri Hilson — introduced Mary J Blige and Lil Wayne
- Pat Monahan — presented Country Artist of the Year
- Bret Michaels — introduced Kesha
- Will.i.am — presented Top Touring Artist to U2
- Justin Bieber — presented Female Artist of the Year
- The Script — introduced Chevrolet Battle of the Bands winner Gentleman Hall
- Taylor Swift — introduced Nicki Minaj and Britney Spears
- Matthew Morrison — presented Neil Diamond with the Icon Award

== Winners and nominees ==
Winners are listed first and in bold.

Top Artist	Top New Artist
**Eminem**; Justin Bieber; Lady Gaga; Rihanna; Taylor Swift	**Justin Bieber**; Taio Cruz; Ke$ha; Bruno Mars; Nicki Minaj
Top Male Artist	Top Female Artist
**Eminem**; Justin Bieber; Drake; Bruno Mars; Usher	**Rihanna**; Ke$ha; Lady Gaga; Katy Perry; Taylor Swift
Top Duo/Group	Top Billboard 200 Artist
**The Black Eyed Peas**; Bon Jovi; Lady Antebellum; Linkin Park; U2	**Taylor Swift**; Justin Bieber; Susan Boyle; Eminem; Lady Antebellum
Top Billboard 200 Album	Top Hot 100 Artist
**Recovery – Eminem**; My World 2.0 – Justin Bieber; The Gift – Susan Boyle; Need You Now – Lady Antebellum; Speak Now – Taylor Swift	**Katy Perry**; Ke$ha; Bruno Mars; Rihanna; Usher
Top Hot 100 Song	Top Touring Artist
**"Dynamite" – Taio Cruz**; "Love the Way You Lie" – Eminem featuring Rihanna; "Just the Way You Are" – Bruno Mars; "California Gurls" – Katy Perry featuring Snoop Dogg; "OMG" – Usher featuring will.i.am	**U2**; Bon Jovi; Michael Bublé; Lady Gaga; Roger Waters
Top Digital Songs Artist	Top Digital Song
**Katy Perry**; Eminem; Ke$ha; Bruno Mars; Rihanna	**"Dynamite" – Taio Cruz**; "Airplanes" – B.o.B. featuring Hayley Williams; "Love the Way You Lie" – Eminem featuring Rihanna; "Just the Way You Are" – Bruno Mars; "California Gurls" – Katy Perry featuring Snoop Dogg
Top Radio Songs Artist	Top Radio Song
**Rihanna**; Drake; Bruno Mars; Katy Perry; Usher	**"Just the Way You Are" – Bruno Mars**; "Dynamite" – Taio Cruz; "Love the Way You Lie" – Eminem featuring Rihanna; "DJ Got Us Fallin' in Love" – Usher featuring Pitbull; "OMG" – Usher featuring will.i.am
Top Streaming Artist	Top Streaming Song (Audio)
**Justin Bieber**; Eminem; Lady Gaga; Rihanna; Shakira	**"Just a Dream" – Nelly**; "Dynamite" – Taio Cruz; "Love the Way You Lie" – Eminem featuring Rihanna; "Need You Now" – Lady Antebellum; "Just the Way You Are" – Bruno Mars
Top Streaming Song (Video)	Top Digital Media Artist
**"Baby" – Justin Bieber featuring Ludacris**; "Not Afraid" – Eminem; "Love the Way You Lie" – Eminem featuring Rihanna; "Bad Romance" – Lady Gaga; "Waka Waka (This Time for Africa)" – Shakira featuring Freshlyground	**Justin Bieber**; Akon; Eminem; Lady Gaga; Rihanna
Top Pop Artist	Top Pop Album
**Lady Gaga**; Justin Bieber; The Black Eyed Peas; Ke$ha; Katy Perry	**My World 2.0 – Justin Bieber**; The E.N.D. – The Black Eyed Peas; Animal – Ke$ha; The Fame – Lady Gaga; Teenage Dream – Katy Perry
Top Pop Song	Top R&B Artist
**"Dynamite" – Taio Cruz**; "Just the Way You Are" – Bruno Mars; "California Gurls" – Katy Perry featuring Snoop Dogg; "Firework" – Katy Perry; "Teenage Dream" – Katy Perry	**Usher**; Alicia Keys; Monica; Rihanna; Trey Songz
Top R&B Album	Top R&B Song
**Raymond v. Raymond – Usher**; Still Standing – Monica; Loud – Rihanna; Soldier of Love – Sade; Passion, Pain & Pleasure – Trey Songz	**"OMG" – Usher featuring will.i.am**; "Unthinkable (I'm Ready)" – Alicia Keys; "What's My Name" – Rihanna featuring Drake; "Bottoms Up" – Trey Songz featuring Nicki Minaj; "There Goes My Baby" – Usher
Top Rap Artist	Top Rap Album
**Eminem**; Drake; Lil Wayne; Ludacris; Nicki Minaj	**Recovery – Eminem**; Thank Me Later – Drake; Pink Friday – Nicki Minaj; I Am Not a Human Being – Lil Wayne; My Beautiful Dark Twisted Fantasy – Kanye West
Top Rap Song	Top Country Artist
**"Love the Way You Lie" – Eminem featuring Rihanna**; "Airplanes" – B.o.B. featuring Hayley Williams; "Nothin' on You" – B.o.B. featuring Bruno Mars; "Just a Dream" – Nelly; "Like a G6" - Far*East Movement featuring Dev & The Cataracs	**Taylor Swift**; Jason Aldean; Kenny Chesney; Lady Antebellum; Zac Brown Band
Top Country Album	Top Country Song
**Speak Now – Taylor Swift**; My Kinda Party – Jason Aldean; Need You Now – Lady Antebellum; The Incredible Machine – Sugarland; The Foundation – Zac Brown Band	**"Need You Now" – Lady Antebellum**; "If I Die Young" – The Band Perry; "The House That Built Me" – Miranda Lambert; "Stuck Like Glue" – Sugarland; "Mine" – Taylor Swift
Top Rock Artist	Top Rock Album
**Train**; Kings of Leon; Linkin Park; Mumford & Sons; Muse	**Sigh No More – Mumford & Sons**; Brothers – The Black Keys; To the Sea – Jack Johnson; Born Free – Kid Rock; A Thousand Suns – Linkin Park
Top Rock Song	Top Latin Artist
**"Hey, Soul Sister" – Train**; "Someone like You" – The Dirty Heads featuring Rome; "Dog Days Are Over" – Florence + The Machine; "Little Lion Man" – Mumford & Sons; "Animal" – Neon Trees	**Shakira**; Enrique Iglesias; Pitbull; Prince Royce; Wisin & Yandel
Top Latin Album	Top Latin Song
**Euphoria – Enrique Iglesias**; Iconos – Marc Anthony; Dejarte de Amar – Camila; Prince Royce – Prince Royce; Sale el Sol – Shakira	**"Waka Waka (This Time for Africa)" – Shakira featuring Freshlyground**; "Cuando Me Enamoro" – Enrique Iglesias featuring Juan Luis Guerra; "Bon Bon" – Pitbull; "Gypsy" – Shakira; "Loca" – Shakira featuring El Cata
Top Dance Artist	Top Dance Album
**Lady Gaga**; The Black Eyed Peas; David Guetta; Rihanna; La Roux	**The Fame – Lady Gaga**; Tron: Legacy (Soundtrack) – Daft Punk; The Fame Monster – Lady Gaga; The Remix – Lady Gaga; Ocean Eyes – Owl City
Top Dance Song	Top Alternative Artist
**"Stereo Love" – Edward Maya & Vika Jigulina**; "Bad Romance" – Lady Gaga; "Telephone " – Lady Gaga featuring Beyoncé; "Bulletproof" – La Roux; "We No Speak Americano" – Yolanda Be Cool & Dcup	**Mumford & Sons**; The Black Keys; Kings of Leon; Linkin Park; Muse
Top Alternative Album	Top Alternative Song
**Sigh No More – Mumford & Sons**; Brothers – The Black Keys; To the Sea – Jack Johnson; Come Around Sundown – Kings of Leon; A Thousand Suns – Linkin Park	**"Animal" – Neon Trees**; "Dog Days Are Over" – Florence + The Machine; "Waiting for the End" – Linkin Park; "The Cave" – Mumford & Sons; "Little Lion Man" – Mumford & Sons
Top Christian Artist	Top Christian Album
**Chris Tomlin**; Casting Crowns; MercyMe; Skillet; tobyMac	**Awake – Skillet**; The Generous Mr. Lovewell – MercyMe; Tonight – tobyMac; And If Our God Is for Us – Laura Story; WOW Hits 2011 – Various Artists
Top Christian Song	Top Social Artist (fan-voted)
**"Our God" – Chris Tomlin**; "Live Like We're Dying" – Kris Allen; "All of Creation" – MercyMe; "Lead Me" – Sanctus Real; "Get Back Up" – tobyMac	**Justin Bieber**; Akon; Eminem; Lady Gaga; Rihanna
Icon Award	Millennium Award
Neil Diamond	Beyoncé
Billboard.com Fan Favorite	Viral Innovator of the Year
Justin Bieber	Cee Lo Green

=== Artists with multiple wins and nominations ===
Artists that received multiple nominations
Nominations	Artist
18	Rihanna
17	Eminem
15	Lady Gaga
11	Justin Bieber
11	Bruno Mars
11	Katy Perry
10	Usher
7	Taio Cruz
7	Lady Antebellum
7	Mumford & Sons
7	Shakira
7	Taylor Swift
6	Ke$ha
6	Linkin Park
5	Drake
4	The Black Eyed Peas
4	Nicki Minaj
3	B.o.B.
3	The Black Keys
3	Enrique Iglesias
3	Kings of Leon
3	Mercy Me
3	Pitbull
3	Snoop Dogg
3	tobyMac
3	Trey Songz
3	will.i.am
2	Akon
2	Jason Aldean
2	Bon Jovi
2	Susan Boyle
2	Florence + The Machine
2	Freshlyground
2	Jack Johnson
2	Alicia Keys
2	Lil Wayne
2	Ludacris
2	Monica
2	Muse
2	Nelly
2	Neon Trees
2	Prince Royce
2	La Roux
2	Skillet
2	Sugarland
2	Chris Tomlin
2	Train
2	U2
2	Hayley Williams
2	Zac Brown Band

Artists that received multiple awards
Wins	Artist
6	Justin Bieber
6	Eminem
4	Taio Cruz
3	Lady Gaga
3	Mumford & Sons
3	Rihanna
3	Taylor Swift
3	Usher
2	Katy Perry
2	Shakira
2	Chris Tomlin
2	Train

== Critical reception and controversy ==
Overall, critics praised the performances in whole. Critics, however, noted Beyoncé as the standout performer of the night. However, some controversy was generated from the show. The Parents Television Council criticized Rihanna and Britney Spears' performance of "S&M", calling it "explicit", with PTC president saying "I cannot imagine what would possibly lead the ABC television network to air a profanity-laced, S&M sex show on primetime broadcast television", while criticizing the choice to air the performance first, on what they claim is a normally family targeted time slot (the show aired at 8:00 p.m.).
