= The Worship Sessions =

Studio album by MercyMe
- Released: August 30, 2011
- Recorded: 2011
- Genres: Contemporary Christian; Contemporary worship
- Length: 44:00
- Labels: Fair Trade; Columbia
- Producer: MercyMe

MercyMe chronology
The Generous Mr. Lovewell (2010)	The Worship Sessions (2011)	The Hurt & the Healer (2012)

The Worship Sessions is an album by Contemporary Christian music band MercyMe. It was released on August 30, 2011 exclusively through Family Christian Stores. The album consists of covers of popular worship songs and hymns, as well as two original songs by the band itself. This was the last MercyMe album to feature co-founding member and keyboardist Jim Bryson prior to their next studio album The Hurt & the Healer.

== Track listing ==
No.	Title	Writer(s)	Original artist(s)	Length
1.	"Hungry"	Kathryn Scott	Kathryn Scott	2:53
2.	"Hosanna"	Brooke Fraser	Hillsong Worship	4:14
3.	"My Glorious"	Martin Smith; Stuart Garrard	Delirious?	4:44
4.	"Mighty to Save"	Ben Fielding; Reuben Morgan	Hillsong Worship	4:14
5.	"Come Thou Fount"	Robert Robinson; trad.		5:01
6.	"Messiah / You're Beautiful"	Phil Wickham	Phil Wickham	3:26
7.	"Hearts Sing Louder"	Bart Millard; Jim Bryson; Mike Scheuchzer; Nathan Cochran; Robby Shaffer		3:48
8.	"Just as I Am (Oh Come)"	Charlotte Elliott; William Batchelder Bradbury		4:01
9.	"Psalm 139 (You Are There)"	Millard; Kendall Combes		4:19
10.	"In Christ Alone"	Keith Getty; Stuart Townend	Keith Getty	4:27
11.	"There Is a Fountain"	William Cowper; trad.		3:07
Total length:				44:00

== Personnel ==
MercyMe

- Bart Millard
- Jim Bryson
- Mike Scheuchzer
- Barry Graul
- Nathan Cochran
- Robby Shaffer

Additional musician

- Aaron Sternke – percussion, backing vocals

=== Production ===
- MercyMe – producers, overdub recording
- Aaron Sternke – engineer, digital editing
- Travis Brockway – assistant engineer
- Lee Bridges – mixing
- Joel Cameron – additional studio help
- Brody Harper – artwork, photography
- Mike Scheuchzer – photography
- Jeff Taylor – photography
