= Move (MercyMe song) =

2011 song by MercyMe

Single by MercyMe

from the album The Generous Mr. Lovewell
- Released: May 23, 2011
- Recorded: 2009–2010
- Genre: Dance-rock
- Length: 2:58
- Label: Fair Trade
- Songwriter(s): James Bryson, Nathan Cochran, Barry Graul, Dan Muckala, Michael John Scheuchzer, Bart Millard, Robin Shaffer
- Producer(s): Brown Bannister, Muckala

MercyMe singles chronology
"Beautiful" (2010)	"Move" (2011)	"The Hurt & The Healer" (2012)

"Move" is a song by Christian rock band MercyMe. Written by MercyMe and Dan Muckala, "Move" is a dance-rock song with a sound similar to that of pop rock band Maroon 5. The theme of the song's lyrics is perseverance through adversity. Released on May 23, 2011, as the third single from MercyMe's 2010 album The Generous Mr. Lovewell, "Move" was received with positive critical reviews, especially for the arrangement of the song. "Move" attained success as a single, peaking atop Billboard magazine's Christian Songs, Hot Christian AC, and Christian AC Indicator charts, as well as at No. 6 on the Billboard Christian CHR chart and No. 20 on the Billboard Bubbling Under Hot 100 Singles chart.

== Background and composition ==
Move
A sample of the chorus of "Move".

"Move" was written by MercyMe and Dan Muckala. It was produced by Brown Bannister and Muckala, and was recorded by F. Reid Shippen at Sonic Ranch in El Paso, Texas. Overdubs were recorded by Muckala, Bannister, and Billy Whittington at Towsensend Sound and Glomo Studio. The song was mixed by Shippen at Robot Lemon in Nashville, Tennessee and was mastered by Ted Jensen at Sterling Sound in New York.

"Move" is a dance-rock song with a length of two minutes and fifty-eight seconds. It is set in the key of A minor and has a tempo of 100 beats per minute, with a vocal range spanning from G_{4}-G_{5}. The musical feel of "Move" has been compared to that of Maroon 5, particularly their songs "This Love" and "Makes Me Wonder". Lyrically, the song is about perseverance through adversity, with the narrator singing that he will “move to a different drum no matter what life brings". The song does not directly mention God.

== Reception ==
=== Critical reception ===
"Move" received generally positive reviews. Allmusic reviewer Jared Johnson called the song "as relevant as anything MercyMe have ever done". Roger Gelwicks of Jesus Freak Hideout described "Move" as "an upbeat rocker complete with an infectious handclap beat". Andy Argyrakis of Today's Christian Music described the song as "foot stomping", and Kevin Davis of Christian Music Review commented that the song "has a fantastic rock-dance arrangement like 'This Love' by Maroon 5". Tris McCall of The Star-Ledger was more negative in his review, commenting that the song "sounds so much like Maroon 5 that it’s almost embarrassing", and that "in a music industry governed by sanity, the two songwriters [Adam Levine of Maroon 5 and Bart Millard of MercyMe] would sing shoulder to shoulder and reach a common audience".

=== Chart performance ===
"Move" debuted at No. 41 on the Hot Christian Songs chart for the chart week of May 28, 2011, and advanced to No. 30 in its second chart week. "Move" advanced to No. 20 in its fourth chart week and to No. 9 in its tenth chart week. The song advanced to No. 5 in its twelfth chart week and spent two more weeks on the chart before advancing to No. 1. "Move" spent a total of nine consecutive weeks atop the Christian Songs chart before dropping to No. 2, supplanted by Casting Crowns' "Courageous". The song spent a total of three consecutive weeks at the No. 2 spot before falling to No. 3. "Move" dropped to No. 6 in its twenty-ninth chart week, and fell to No. 9 in its thirtieth and final week on the chart. In all, "Move" spent a total of thirty weeks on the chart, nine of them at No. 1.

"Move" has also peaked at No. 1 on the Hot Christian AC chart, No. 1 on the Christian AC Indicator chart, No. 6 on the Christian CHR chart, and No. 20 on the Bubbling Under Hot 100 chart, which is equivalent to No. 120 on the Billboard Hot 100.

== Charts ==
=== Weekly charts ===
Chart	Peak position
Billboard Hot Christian Songs	1
Billboard Hot Christian AC	1
Billboard Christian AC Indicator	1
Billboard Christian CHR	6
Billboard Bubbling Under Hot 100	20

=== Year-end charts ===
Chart (2011)	Position
Billboard Christian Songs	10
Billboard Hot Christian AC	14
Billboard Christian Digital Songs	28
