= Love Broke Thru (TobyMac song) =

Single by TobyMac

from the album This Is Not a Test
- Released: 19 September 2016
- Genre: Christian hip hop, Christian rock, Christian pop
- Length: 3:57
- Label: ForeFront
- Songwriters: Bryan Fowler, Bart Millard, Toby McKeehan, Christopher Stevens

TobyMac singles chronology
"Move (Keep Walkin')" (2016)	"Love Broke Thru" (2016)

Music video
- "Love Broke Thru" on YouTube

"Love Broke Thru" is a song by Christian hip hop-rock-pop musician TobyMac from his seventh studio album, This Is Not a Test. The song reached No. 1 on Christian Airplay.

== Background ==
According to TobyMac, the song was written about how God broke through in his life and how he feels the same should happen with a divided nation. The video for the song was released on Billboard in January 2017. It depicts a young man trying to cope with anger while his grandfather calls for peace among protests over police violence around the country.

== Charts ==
=== Weekly charts ===
Chart (2017)	Peak position
US Christian AC (Billboard)	1
US Christian Airplay (Billboard)	1
US Hot Christian Songs (Billboard)	3
US Christian AC Indicator (Billboard)	2
US Christian Soft AC (Billboard)	9

=== Year-end charts ===
Chart (2017)	Peak position
US Christian Songs (Billboard)	11
US Christian Airplay (Billboard)	4
US Christian AC (Billboard)	3
US Christian CHR (Billboard)	10

== Certifications ==
Region	Certification	Certified units/sales
United States (RIAA)	Platinum	1,000,000^{‡}
^{‡} Sales+streaming figures based on certification alone.
