= Tenth Avenue North discography =

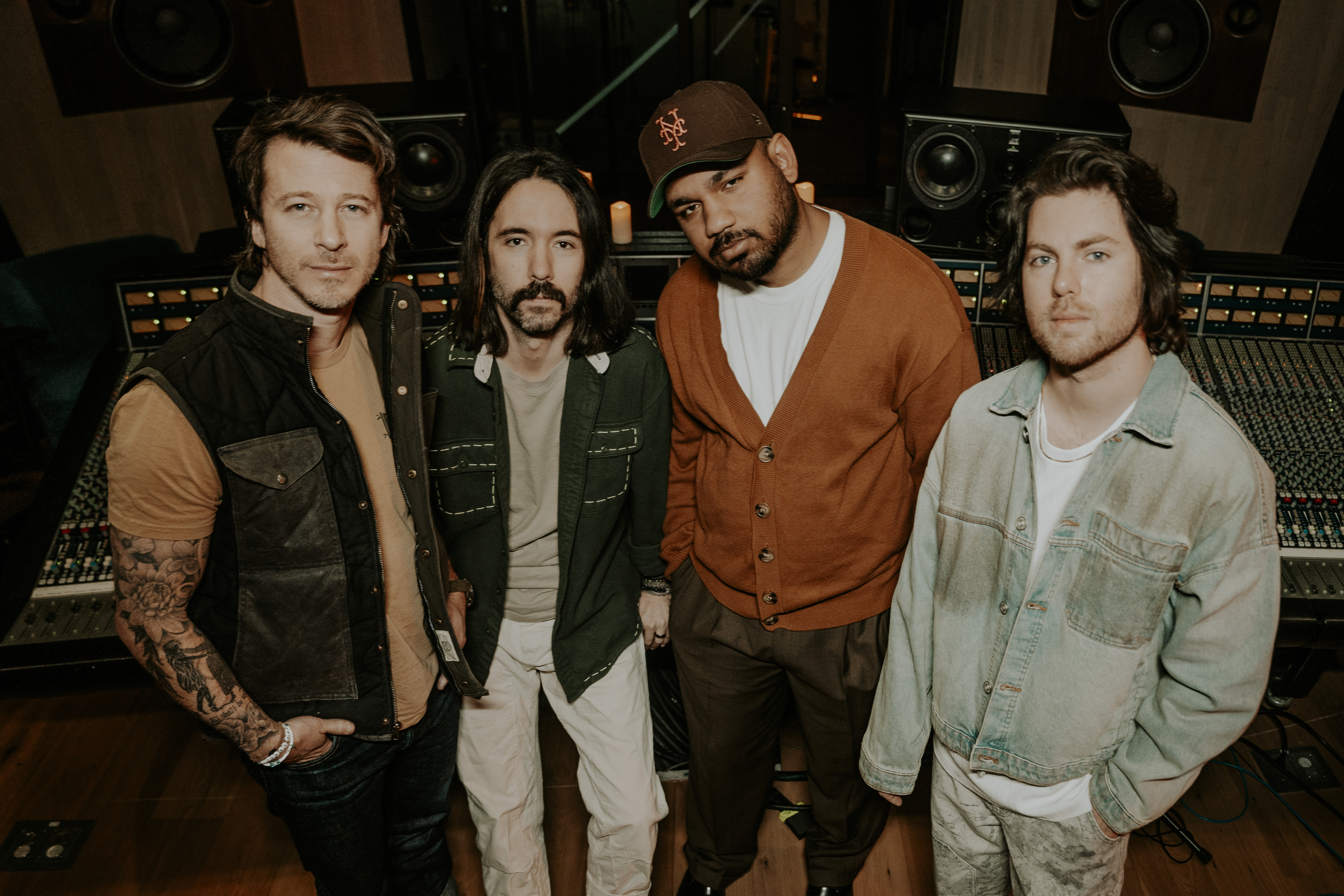
- Studio albums: 9
- EPs: 4
- Live albums: 1
- Singles: 22

The discography of American contemporary Christian band Tenth Avenue North, which consists of nine studio albums, four independent albums, one live album, four EPs, and 22 singles.

== Independent albums ==
- 2002: Broken Down
- 2003: Don't Look Back
- 2005: Speaking of Silence
- 2006: God With Us EP

== Studio albums ==
Year	Album details	Peak chart positions				Certifications
Year	Album details	US	US Christian	US Rock	US Alt.	Certifications
2008	Over and Underneath: Released: May 20, 2008; Label: Reunion Records	39	2	37	—	RIAA: Gold
2010	The Light Meets the Dark: Released: May 11, 2010; Label: Reunion Records	15	1	7	4	
2012	The Struggle: Released: August 21, 2012; Label: Reunion Records	9	1	1	—	
2014	Cathedrals: Released: November 10, 2014; Label: Reunion Records	32	1	9	—	
2016	Followers: Released: October 14, 2016; Label: Reunion Records	151	5	22	—	
2017	Decade the Halls, Vol. 1: Released: November 10, 2017; Label: Reunion Records	—	—	—	—	
2019	No Shame: Released: August 2, 2019; Label: Reunion Records	—	10	—	—	
2020	Unplugged for the People (The Acoustic Greatest Hits): Released: October 30, 2020; Label: Reunion Records	—	—	—	—	
2025	Learning to Trust: Released: May 30, 2025; Label: Remade / The Fuel Music	—	—	—	—	
"—" denotes the album did not chart.

== EPs ==
Year	Album details	Peak chart positions	
Year	Album details	US	US Christian
2012	iTunes Session EP: Released: December 14, 2012	—	38
2014	Islands: Released: July 10, 2014	55	2
2018	The Things We've Been Afraid To Say: Released: October 19, 2018	—	27
2024	Reconcile: Released: June 7, 2024	—	—

== Live albums ==
Year	Album details	Peak chart positions
Year	Album details	US Christian
2011	Live: Inside and In Between: Released: March 1, 2011; Label: Reunion Records	34

== Singles ==
Year	Single	Peak Chart Positions			Certifications	Album					
Year	Single	US Christ.	US. Christ. Airplay	US Bub	Certifications	Album					
2008	"Love Is Here"	3		—		Over and Underneath					
2008	"By Your Side"	2		—	RIAA: Platinum	Over and Underneath					
2009	"Hold My Heart"	4		—		Over and Underneath					
2010	"Go Tell It on the Mountain"	13		—		The Essential Christmas Collection					
2010	"Healing Begins"	4		—		The Light Meets the Dark					
2010	"Strong Enough to Save"	1		—		The Light Meets the Dark					
2010	"You Are More"	1		—	RIAA: Gold	The Light Meets the Dark					
2010	"The Truth Is Who You Are"	—		—		The Light Meets the Dark					
2011	"Times"	49		—		Over and Underneath					
2011	"Deck the Halls"	7		—		Decade the Halls Vol. 1					
2012	"Losing"	2		20		The Struggle					
2013	"Worn"	9		—	RIAA: Gold	The Struggle					
2013	"The Struggle"	26		—		The Struggle					
2014	"No Man Is an Island"	11	7	—		Cathedrals					
2015	"Stars in the Night"	29	21	—		Cathedrals					
2016	"What You Want"	17	12	—		Followers					
2017	"I Have This Hope"	5	2	—		Followers					
2017	"Control (Somehow You Want Me)"	7	1	—		Followers					
2018	"Afraid"	—	47	—		Followers					
2018	"Secrets (Light Shine In)"	—	45	—		The Things We've Been Afraid to Say - EP					
2019	"Greater Than All My Regrets"	23	19	—		No Shame					
2019	"No Shame" (featuring The Young Escape)	49	32	—		No Shame					
2019	"Paranoia"	—	—	—		No Shame					
2023	"Suddenly"	—	—	—		Learning to Trust					
2024	"Invited"	42	17	—		Learning to Trust					
2024	"Letting Go for Dear Life"	—	—	—		Learning to Trust					
2025	"Kind to Myself"	—	—	—		Learning to Trust	2026	"Broken People"	—	—	—

== Other charted songs ==
Year	Song	Peak Chart Positions	Album
Year	Song	US. Christ. Airplay	Album
2025	"Spirit Goes"	30	Learning to Trust
