= All of Creation (song) =

Single by MercyMe

from the album The Generous Mr. Lovewell
- Released: January 29, 2010 (radio)
- Recorded: 2009–2010 in the United States (Note: According to the inner liner notes of the album.): Quad Studios (Nashville, TN)
- Genre: Christian rock, pop, worship
- Length: 3:56
- Label: INO
- Songwriters: Brown Bannister, James Bryson, Nathan Cochran, Barry Graul, Bart Millard, Dan Muckala, Michael John Scheuchzer, Robin Shaffer
- Producers: Bannister, Muckala

MercyMe singles chronology
"Finally Home" (2009)	"All of Creation" (2010)	"Beautiful" (2010)

"All of Creation" is a song by Christian rock band MercyMe. The song, written by MercyMe, Brown Bannister, and Dan Muckala, lyrically revolves around the themes of love, life, and belief, as well as the foundation of Christian faith. The song was intended to refer to the birth, death, and resurrection of Jesus in each verse and has been described as 'pop' and 'worship'.

Released to radio on January 29, 2010, as the lead single from MercyMe's 2010 album The Generous Mr. Lovewell, "All of Creation" attained considerable success on Christian radio. The single spent ten weeks atop Billboard magazine's Hot Christian Songs chart and eleven weeks atop the Christian AC Monitored chart, and peaked at No. 1 on the Soft AC/Inspo chart. The song also peaked inside the top ten on the Christian CHR chart, No. 2 on the Bubbling Under Hot 100 Singles chart, and at No. 14 on the Heatseekers Songs chart. The song was ranked at the top spot on Billboard magazine's 2010 year-end Hot Christian Songs and Hot Christian AC charts, as well as at No. 16 on the year-end Christian Digital Songs chart and No. 23 on the year-end Christian CHR chart. "All of Creation" was nominated for "Song of the Year" and "Pop/Contemporary Recorded Song of the Year" at the 42nd GMA Dove Awards, and was nominated for "Christian Song of the Year" at the 2011 Billboard Music Awards.

== Background ==
In an interview with Kevin Davis of New Release Tuesday, lead singer Bart Millard said the idea behind the song was related to the theme of the album The Generous Mr. Lovewell. Millard stated, "The entire album deals with three main aspects of love. The theme of the record is to 'love well' as Jesus commands us in the greatest commandment. There are songs about inward love such as in our song 'Beautiful.' There are songs based on 'we love because He first loved us,' which is the basis of this first single, 'All of Creation'." Millard also said, "I set out to write a song that was confessional and refers to the birth, death and resurrection of Jesus in each verse. It was my intent to mention every stage of Christ’s condescension and atoning sacrifice throughout the song."

== Composition ==
All of Creation
A sample of the "All of Creation", a Christian rock song.

"All of Creation" is a Christian rock song with a length of 3 minutes and 56 seconds. It is set in common time and the key of B♭ major with a steady rock tempo of 104 beats per minute. The song has also been described as 'pop' and 'worship'.

Lyrical themes in the song include love, life, and belief. Lead singer Bart Millard intended the song to refer to the birth, death, and resurrection of Jesus in each verse. Guitarist Mike Scheuchzer said the song is "a picture of the change we want to see in our own lives. Without love like this, everything we do, everything we are, is in vain."

Millard also noted, "Not a lot of songs mention the foundation of what we believe in. The whole idea that Christ was born of a virgin, he died on the cross, he rose again. Just the basic principles of Christianity". He also commented that "the song kind of takes us there, I say 'kind of' because the first line used to be talking about until a child was born, but it was instantly a Christmas song... but it does, the first verse goes through talking about how we were completely separated until the cross, basically." Regarding the chorus of the song, Millard said "the whole idea of the chorus and the sense that it brings in, with the tons of voices singing, is the fact that there's a day thats going to come when we are going to worship and be as one."

== Release and promotion ==
"All of Creation" was officially released to radio on January 29, 2010, and as a digital single on March 2, 2010. The song also had a limited CD single release at select Walmart locations.

== Reception ==
=== Critical response ===
Critical reception to "All of Creation" was mixed to positive. While Kevin Davis of Christianmusicreview called the song "(a) worship chorus written for the church in the style of 'You Reign' or 'God With Us'" and Kevin McNeese of New Release Tuesday called the song "amazing", Roger Gelwicks of Jesus Freak Hideout, while noting that "it's not a bad song by any means", stated that "(it) sounds precisely like the successful singles that have made MercyMe famous... there's nothing new that's offered that hasn't been heard before from the band".

=== Chart performance ===
"All of Creation" debuted at No. 31 for the chart week of February 13, 2010 on the Billboard Hot Christian Songs chart. It advanced to No. 21 in its second chart week, and to No. 10 in its third week. The song advanced to No. 3 in its seventh chart week, and to No. 2 in its ninth chart week. In its tenth chart week, "All of Creation" advanced to No. 1, a position it held for ten consecutive weeks. The song dropped to No. 2 in its nineteenth chart week, and held that spot for an additional week before dropping to No. 3. "All of Creation" held the No. 3 spot for seven consecutive weeks before dropping to No. 6 and spent an additional ten weeks on the chart before dropping out. "All of Creation" spent a total of thirty-eight weeks on the Hot Christian Songs chart. On the Heatseekers Songs chart, "All of Creation" debuted at No. 16 for the chart week of March 20, 2010. The song dropped to No. 22 the following week but advanced to No. 15 in its fourth chart week. It reached its peak of No. 14 for the chart week of April 24, 2010, and spent another nine weeks on the chart before dropping out. In all, the song spent fifteen weeks on the Heatseekers Songs chart. "All of Creation" spent eleven weeks atop the Billboard Christian AC Monitored chart, the longest run MercyMe has spent at No. 1 in their career. The song also topped the Hot Christian AC and Soft AC/Inspo charts and peaked inside the top 10 on the Christian CHR chart, as well as at No. 11 on the Bubbling Under Hot 100 Singles chart.

"All of Creation" was listed on several year-end charts in 2010. It ranked at No. 1 on the Hot Christian Songs and Hot Christian AC charts, No. 16 on the Christian Digital Songs chart, and No. 23 on the Christian CHR chart.

=== Awards and accolades ===
"All of Creation" was nominated for two awards at the 42nd GMA Dove Awards: "Song of the Year" and "Pop/Contemporary Recorded Song of the Year". It was also nominated for "Christian Song of the Year" at the 2011 Billboard Music Awards.

== Charts ==
=== Weekly charts ===
Chart (2010)	Peak position
Billboard Hot Christian Songs	1
Billboard Christian AC Monitored	1
Billboard Soft AC/Inspirational	1
Billboard Bubbling Under Hot 100 Singles	11
Billboard Heatseekers Songs	14

=== Year-end charts ===
Chart (2010)	Position
Billboard Hot Christian Songs	1
Billboard Hot Christian AC	1
Billboard Christian Digital Songs	16
Billboard Christian CHR	23

=== Decade-end charts ===
Chart (2010s)	Position
US Christian Songs (Billboard)	37
