= I Lift My Hands =

Single by Chris Tomlin

from the album And If Our God Is for Us...
- Released: April 23, 2011
- Studio: Glomo Studios, (Nashville, TN), White Cabin Studio, (Atlanta, GA)
- Genre: CCM, worship
- Length: 4:37
- Label: sixsteps
- Songwriters: Chris Tomlin; Matt Maher; Louie Giglio

Chris Tomlin singles chronology
"I Will Follow" (2010)	"I Lift My Hands" (2011)	"How Great is Our God (World Edition)" (2011)

Music video
- "I Lift My Hands" on YouTube

"I Lift My Hands" is a song by American contemporary Christian music artist Chris Tomlin from his 2010 album And If Our God Is for Us.... It was released on April 23, 2011, as the third single. The song became Tomlin's fourth Hot Christian Songs No. 1, staying there for one week. It lasted 33 weeks on the overall chart. The song is played in a B major key, and 84 beats per minute.

== Background ==
"I Lift My Hands" was released on April 23, 2011, as the third single for his sixth studio album, And If Our God Is for Us.... The song was written by Tomlin, Matt Maher and Louie Giglio. The song was inspired by the bible verse from Psalm 28:2 – "Hear my cry for mercy as I call to you for help, as I lift up my hands toward your Most Holy Place." Tomlin described it as a "cry to God at times when you can barely hold your hands up". Tomlin told the message behind the song in an interview with "NewReleaseToday": "Some of my songs start with Louie. When we wrote 'I Will Rise,' Louie said he felt like we should have a song for when people look over a grave or lose someone to give them a song of hope. There’s not too many of those songs. There’s 'It Is Well With My Soul' and 'Blessed Be Your Name.' We decided we needed a song for those situations. I co-wrote 'I Lift My Hands' with Louie Giglio and Matt Maher. The song comes out of a struggle Louie had with anxiety and panic. He was struggling with health issues and he felt like everything was shutting down. I remember he would say that at night, everything was dark and consuming. So many people are there and can relate to what that feels like. In the night, Louie would just start singing to God and lift his hands to God in his bed. I still don't know the tune of Louie's song, but he came to me with the words, 'be still my soul, there is a healer, His love is deeper than the sea, His mercy is unfailing, His fortress is for the weak, I lift my hands to believe again.' When he sent me those lyrics, he said if this hits you in any way for a song to let him know. I was like, yes, it's already there. So the song became 'I Lift My Hands'."

== Music video ==
The music video for the single "I Lift My Hands" was released on May 24, 2011. The visual shows Tomlin performing the song in a dirty, debris filled home.

== Track listing ==
CD release

1. "I Lift My Hands" – 4:38
2. "I Lift My Hands (Medium Key Performance Track With Background Vocals)" – 4:37
3. "I Lift My Hands (High Key Performance Track Without Background Vocals)" – 4:37
4. "I Lift My Hands (Medium Key Performance Track Without Background Vocals)" – 4:38
5. "I Lift My Hands (Low Key Performance Track Without Background Vocals)" – 4:33

== Charts ==
=== Weekly charts ===
Chart (2011)	Peak position
US Christian AC (Billboard)	4
US Hot Christian Songs (Billboard)	1
US Christian AC Indicator (Billboard)	1
US Christian Soft AC (Billboard)	1

=== Year-end charts ===
Chart (2011)	Peak position
US Christian Songs (Billboard)	12

== Certifications ==
Region	Certification	Certified units/sales
United States (RIAA)	Gold	500,000^{‡}
^{‡} Sales+streaming figures based on certification alone.
