= MercyMe =

American Christian band

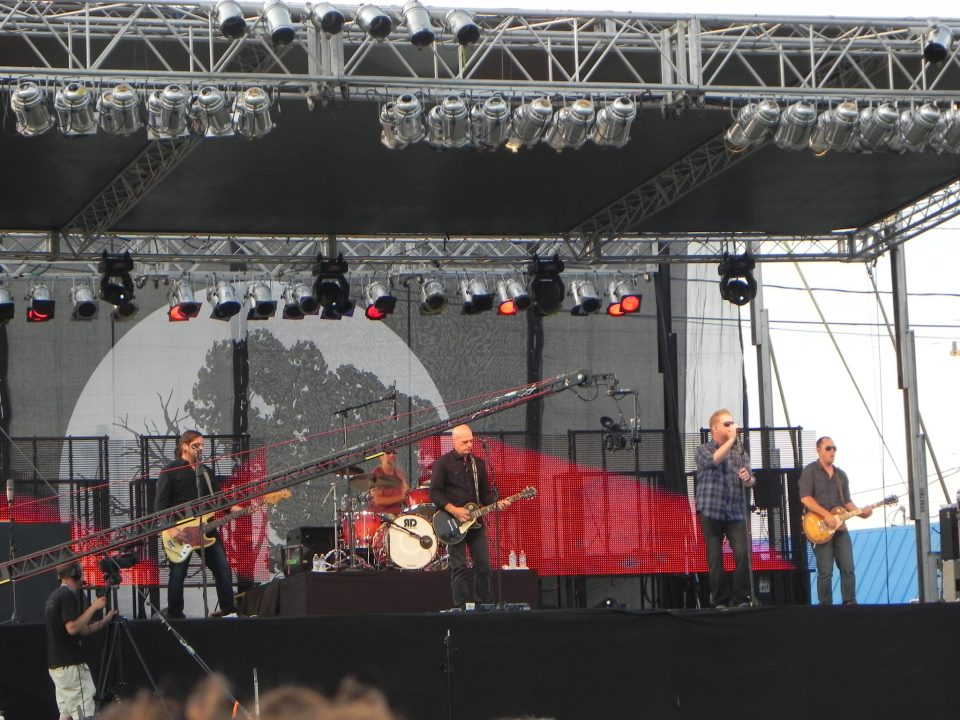
- MercyMe in concert in 2012. The Hurt & The Healer

Background information
- Origin: Edmond, Oklahoma, U.S.
- Genres: Contemporary Christian, worship, Christian rock
- Years active: 1994–present
- Labels: Columbia; Curb; Epic; Fair Trade; INO; Word
- Members: Bart Millard; Nathan Cochran; Michael John Scheuchzer; Robby Shaffer; Barry Graul
- Past members: James Bryson; Trent Austin; Kendall Combes; Jim Richmond; David Cowan
- Website: mercyme.org

MercyMe is an American contemporary Christian music band founded in Edmond, Oklahoma. The band consists of lead vocalist Bart Millard, drummer Robby Shaffer, bassist Nathan Cochran, and guitarists Michael Scheuchzer and Barry Graul.

The band formed in 1994 and released six independent albums before signing with INO Records in 2001. The group first gained mainstream recognition with the crossover single "I Can Only Imagine", which elevated their debut album, Almost There, to triple platinum certification. Since then, the group has released eleven additional studio albums (six of which have been certified gold) and a greatest-hits album, 10. The group has also had 13 consecutive top-five singles on the Billboard Christian Songs chart, with seven of them reaching number one. MercyMe has won eight Dove Awards and has had many Grammy Award nominations. On April 8, 2014, the band released its eighth studio album, titled Welcome to the New. Their 10th studio album, Inhale (Exhale), was released on April 30, 2021. Their 11th studio album, Always Only Jesus, was released on October 21, 2022, and their 12th studio album, Wonder & Awe released on August 8th, 2025.

== History ==
=== Formation and early years ===
Singer Bart Millard met pianist James Phillip Bryson in Lakeland, Florida, after an invitation from his youth pastor. Both led a praise team on a trip to Europe. They both felt a call to work full-time in music. They later met the guitarist Michael John Scheuchzer, who joined them, then moved to Oklahoma City. The group was officially formed in 1994 in Henderson Hills Baptist Church in Edmond, Oklahoma.

In 1997, MercyMe moved to Nashville to find a record label. After a year, they left Nashville for Dallas and recorded an album. Then they settled in Greenville, Texas, and served at Highland Terrace Baptist Church.

The trio set up a studio and a "living area" in an old abandoned daycare center. Bassist Nathan Cochran and drummer Robby Shaffer later joined the band, accompanying them in releasing six independent projects before signing with INO Records in 2001. Unlike their first three major label albums, their earlier indie projects tended to orient more towards rock rhythms. The group's name, "MercyMe", originated during Millard's time as a youth ministry intern in Florida. Concerned that her grandson was home whenever she called, Millard's grandmother would exclaim, "Well mercy me, why don't you get a real job?"

For several years, the band was a mainstay at the popular PlanetWisdom youth conference. The popularity of "I Can Only Imagine" and their meteoric rise led to their no longer leading worship at the conference.

=== Almost There, Spoken For and Undone (2001–2004) ===
After signing with INO Records, Now known as Fair Trade Services, the band released its first major debut album, Almost There. The single "I Can Only Imagine" earned the band a Dove Award in 2002 for song of the year. However, it was not until three years after its release that the song began to gain mainstream success, topping the Billboard 200 sales chart for seven weeks, and peaking at No. 71 on the Hot 100, No. 33 on the Mainstream Top 40, No. 27 on the Adult Top 40, No. 5 on the Adult Contemporary, and No. 52 on the Country Songs charts. The success of the single ultimately propelled Almost There to being certified double platinum, representing sales of over 2 million albums, as well as the single itself being certified platinum.

In 2002, MercyMe released Spoken For, which peaked at No. 2 on the Christian Albums chart. The album's two singles, "Spoken For" and "Word of God Speak", went on to peak at No. 1 on Christian radio charts, with "Word of God Speak" spending a record 22 weeks atop the newly created Billboard Christian Songs chart and was certified Platinum. The album was eventually certified gold by the RIAA.

Spoken For earned the band three Dove Awards, but was to a certain extent overlooked by the attention that "I Can Only Imagine" was receiving in the mainstream markets at the time.

In 2003, guitarist Barry Graul, who had previously been with the Christian hard rock band Whitecross, and one of the guitarists of DC Talk joined MercyMe, giving MercyMe a second guitarist to provide greater depth on their third studio album, Undone. In 2004, the band headlined the "Imagine Tour" with fellow artists Amy Grant and Bebo Norman. In addition to headlining the "Imagine Tour", MercyMe released their third major label album, Undone, which peaked at No. 12 on the Billboard 200 and No. 1 on the Christian Albums charts, their highest debut on the chart at that point. The album spawned three successful singles – "Here With Me" (which topped the Christian Songs chart as well as reaching No. 12 on the Adult Contemporary chart and No. 38 on the Adult Top 40 chart), "Homesick" (which reached No. 3 on the Christian Songs chart and No. 9 on the Adult Contemporary charts), and "In the Blink of an Eye" (which topped the Christian Songs chart). The album itself won a Dove Award for Pop/Contemporary Album of the Year at the 36th GMA Dove Awards, and was certified gold by the RIAA.

MercyMe also released a live video album, MercyMe Live, in 2004, that eventually was certified platinum by the RIAA.

=== The Christmas Sessions and Coming Up to Breathe (2005–2006) ===
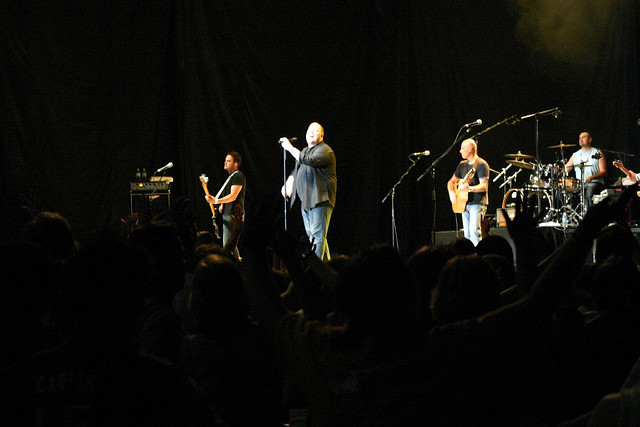
MercyMe in 2006

In 2005, MercyMe launched a tour with Jeremy Camp, The Afters and Monk and Neagle in support of their album, Undone.

After releasing Undone in 2004, the band took a time to rest before their next big release, so they decided to work on a Christmas record. The Christmas Sessions was recorded and was released on September 27, 2005. The album spawned seven songs which hit the top 40 on the Christian Songs chart (with one hitting No. 1 and two others reaching the top ten), and four of these charted in the top 40 of the Adult Contemporary chart (with one peaking in the top 10). The album itself peaked at No. 64 on the Billboard 200 and No. 3 on the Christian Songs chart.

To promote The Christmas Sessions, MercyMe had a Christmas tour with Steven Curtis Chapman, who also released a Christmas album that year titled All I Really Want for Christmas.

In 2006, MercyMe released Coming Up to Breathe, which charted at No. 13 on the Billboard 200 and No. 1 on the Christian Albums chart. Although the band had earned a reputation for being an adult contemporary group with their other albums, the group decided to make Coming Up to Breathe a more rock-oriented album, in the vein of their earlier grunge-influenced albums. As such, it also peaked at No. 5 on the Top Rock Albums chart and No. 13 on the Top Alternative Albums chart, their only chart appearances on these records to date.

Coming Up to Breathe spawned three radio singles ("So Long Self", "Hold Fast", and "Bring the Rain"), two of which ("So Long Self" and "Bring the Rain") reached the top spot on the Christian Songs chart. "So Long Self" and "Hold Fast" also both reached the top 30 on the Adult Contemporary chart. Coming Up to Breathe was eventually certified gold by the RIAA.

In support of Coming Up to Breathe, MercyMe headlined the "Coming Up to Breathe Tour", along with Audio Adrenaline (on its farewell tour) and Aaron Shust, seeing half their shows sell out two weeks into the tour.

=== All That is Within Me, Coming Up to Breathe: Acoustic and 10 (2007–2009) ===
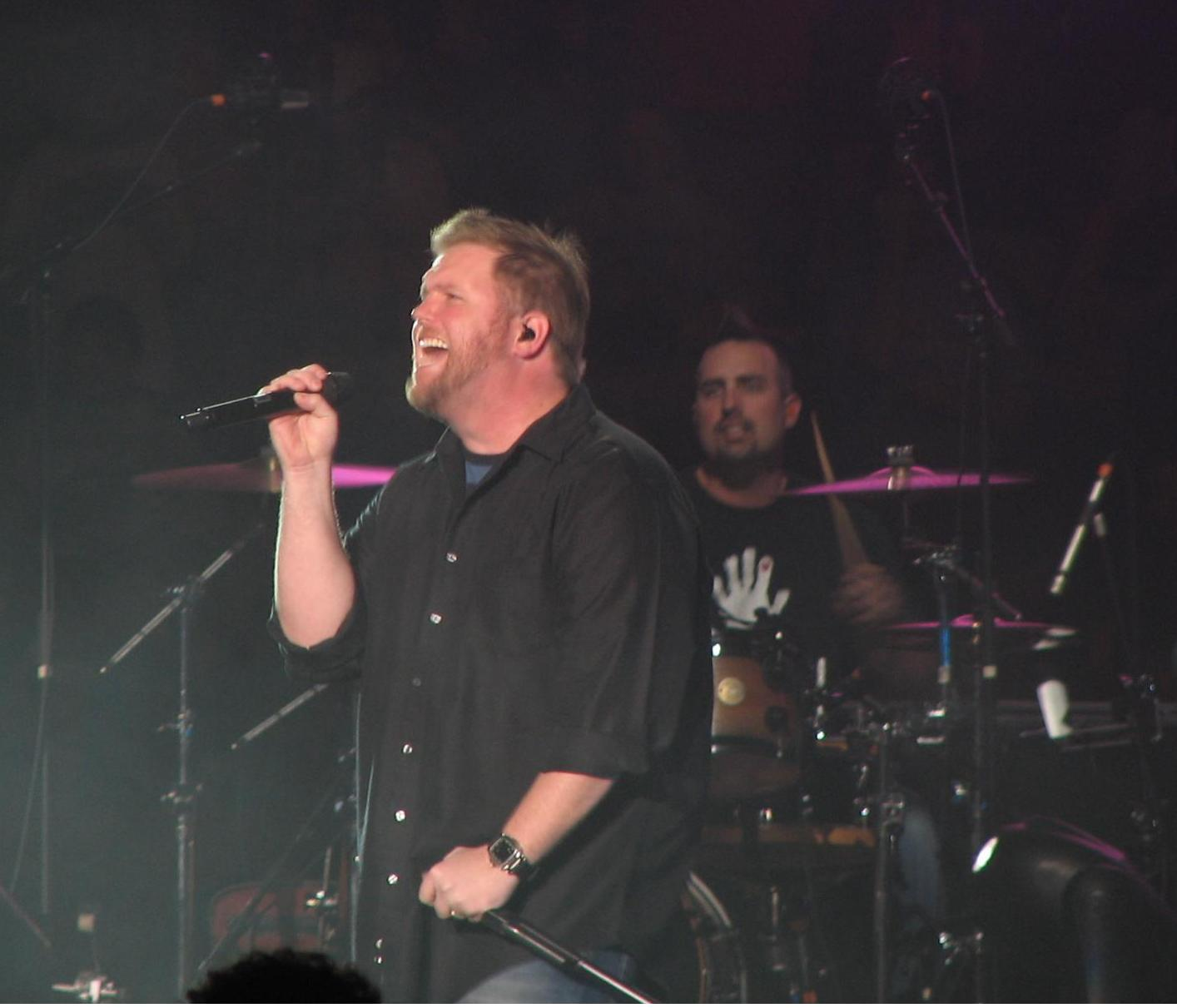
Bart Millard and drummer Robin Shaffer in 2008

On November 20, 2007, MercyMe released All That Is Within Me. Millard, the band's lead singer, had believed that All That is Within Me was going to be a worship album with half of the songs being cover songs and the other half original songs; however, when the band got in studio, they ended up having written all the songs found in this album.

Upon release, the album peaked at No. 15 on the Billboard 200 and No. 1 on the Christian Songs chart. The album contained three singles ("God With Us", "You Reign" and "Finally Home"), all of which reached the top three on the Christian Songs chart; "Finally Home" also peaked at No. 17 on the Adult Contemporary chart (their last appearance on the chart to date). All That Is Within Me was also certified gold by the RIAA.

In 2008, the band released Coming Up to Breathe: Acoustic, an acoustic version of their earlier release Coming Up to Breathe.

On April 7, 2009, MercyMe released their first greatest hits compilation, 10, a double album consisting of 15 studio recordings (12 of which were previously singles and 3 of which were new recordings) and 11 live or concept videos, as well as several documentaries on the band. The album charted at No. 18 on the Billboard 200 and No. 1 on the Christian Songs chart, although no singles were released from the album.

=== The Generous Mr. Lovewell and The Worship Sessions (2010–2011) ===
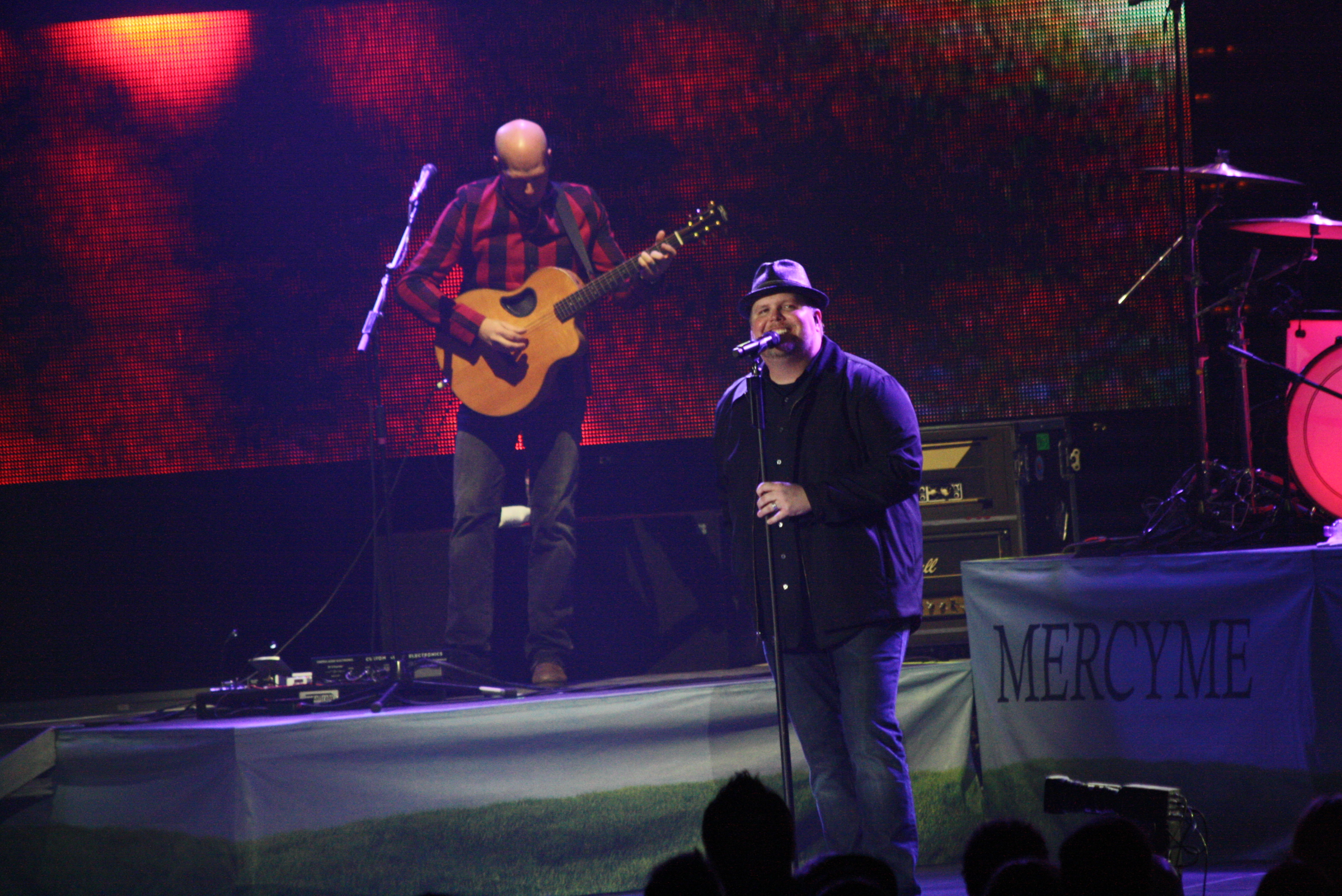
Bart Millard and Barry Graul at a concert in February 2011

MercyMe's sixth studio album, The Generous Mr. Lovewell, was released on May 4, 2010. The album itself peaked at No. 3 on the Billboard 200 (MercyMe's highest debut to date and first top 5 album ever on the chart) and No. 1 on the Christian Albums chart. The album (a concept album relating around the overall theme of love and vaguely relating to its self-titled character) has also spawned three singles – "All of Creation", "Beautiful", and "Move" – all of which reached the top spot on the Christian Songs chart. Upon wrapping up "The Generous Mr. Lovewell" tour, MercyMe was asked to perform the national anthem at a Dallas Cowboys game.

In 2011, the band released The Worship Sessions, a worship album that was released exclusively at Family Christian Book Stores.

=== The Hurt & the Healer, Welcome to the New, Lifer, Inhale (Exhale), Always Only Jesus, Wonder & Awe (2012–present) ===
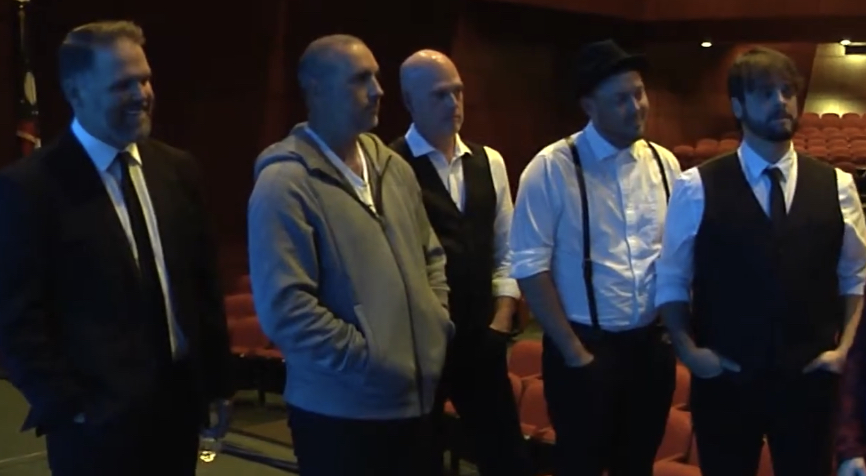
MercyMe in 2015

The Hurt & the Healer was released on May 22, 2012 by Fair Trade and Columbia Records. The album debuted at No. 7 on the Billboard 200, selling 33,000 copies.

Welcome to the New, the band's eighth studio album, was released on April 8, 2014 and is produced by David Garcia and Ben Glover. Singles from this album include the pre-release single "Shake", and post-release singles "Greater" and "Dear Younger Me". Also in 2014, Bryson retired from the group, leaving Millard and Scheuchzer as its two remaining original members.

Lifer, MercyMe's ninth studio album, was released on March 31, 2017, with the lead single off the album being "Even If", which was released on February 17, 2017. It samples the chorus of the hymn "It Is Well with My Soul." The song reached No. 1 on the Billboard Hot Christian Songs chart for three weeks, becoming their twelfth number one single. It also charted on the Bubbling Under Hot 100 chart at No. 20. It is widely considered to be their second biggest song, being certified triple platinum. The second single, "Grace Got You", was released on March 2, 2018. It peaked at No. 3 on the Christian Songs chart and became their record extending 15th chart topper on the Christian Airplay chart. It was nominated for the 2019 Grammy Award for Best Contemporary Christian Music Performance/Song. The third single, "Best News Ever", was released on October 5, 2018.

In 2019 they released the single "Almost Home", and then in 2020 "Hurry Up and Wait" and "Say I Won't", from their tenth album inhale (exhale) that was released on April 30, 2021.

Their eleventh studio album, Always Only Jesus, was released on October 21, 2022. The first single they released was "Then Christ Came" on June 3, 2022. "Better Days Coming" was released on September 9, 2022, and "To Not Worship You" was released on September 30, 2022.

On August 8, 2025, the band released their twelfth studio album, Wonder & Awe. In January 2025, they released "Oh, Death" as the lead single for the album, and on May 9th of the same year, a remix featuring country singer-songwriter Walker Hayes was released. The album was also supported by the promotional singles "Sing (Like You've Already Won)" and "Heartbroken Hallelujah".

== Charity ==
In 2005, MercyMe participated in a benefit concert at Belmont University with various other country, gospel and contemporary Christian artists for the people affected by the Asian tsunami.

In 2009, MercyMe conducted a tour in partnership with Compassion International and Imagine A Cure in order to raise money to help kids with diabetes through Imagine A Cure and people with medical needs around the world through Compassion International.

== Tour bus accident ==
On Saturday, August 8, 2009, at approximately 1:15 am in Fort Wayne, Indiana, the MercyMe tour bus was traveling through an intersection on a green light when an oncoming passenger vehicle made a left turn on red into the path of the bus, which resulted in a collision killing two passengers of the car and resulting in the vehicle's 9 month pregnant driver delivering a stillborn daughter, before herself succumbing to her injuries 3 days later. MercyMe was to perform at Six Flags St. Louis but the park issued a statement saying the show was rescheduled because the band was "involved in a vehicle accident in Indiana".

Despite news reports claiming that the band remained silent during the days after the crash and failed to contact the family of the deceased and injured, MercyMe released a statement through its publicist the day of the crash.

"We continue to pray and ask your prayers for everyone affected by this accident, that God would bring healing, comfort, peace and understanding at a time when they are desperately needed,” the group said.

== Members ==
=== Current members ===
- Bart Millard – lead vocals (1994–present)
- Michael John Scheuchzer – guitars, backing vocals, Hammond organ, keyboards (1994–present)
- Robin Troy "Robby" Shaffer – drums, percussion (1997–present)
- Nathan Cochran – bass, backing vocals, keyboards, piano (1998–present)
- Barry Graul – guitars, backing vocals (2003–present)

=== Former members ===
- Jim Richmond - guitars (1994-1995)
- James Phillip "Jim" Bryson – keyboards (1994–2014)
- Kendall Combes – bass, backing vocals (1994–1998)
- Trent Austin – drums (1994–1997)
- David Cowan - drums (1994-1995)

== Discography ==
=== Independent albums ===
- Pleased to Meet You (1995)
- Traces of Rain (1997)
- Traces of Rain Volume II (1998)
- The Need (1999)
- The Worship Project (1999)
- Look (2000)

=== Studio albums ===
- Almost There (2001)
- Spoken For (2002)
- Undone (2004)
- The Christmas Sessions (2005)
- Coming Up to Breathe (2006)
- All That Is Within Me (2007)
- The Generous Mr. Lovewell (2010)
- The Hurt & the Healer (2012)
- Welcome to the New (2014)
- MercyMe, It's Christmas! (2015)
- Lifer (2017)
- Inhale (Exhale) (2021)
- Always Only Jesus (2022)
- Wonder & Awe (2025)

== Awards and accolades ==
=== Billboard Music Awards ===
Year	Nominee / work	Award	Result
2011	MercyMe	Top Christian Artist	Nominated
2011	The Generous Mr. Lovewell	Top Christian Album	Nominated
2011	"All of Creation"	Top Christian Song	Nominated
2012	MercyMe	Top Christian Artist	Nominated
2013	MercyMe	Top Christian Artist	Nominated
2013	The Hurt & the Healer	Top Christian Album	Nominated
2015	MercyMe	Top Christian Artist	Nominated
2015	Welcome to the New	Top Christian Album	Nominated
2015	"Greater"	Top Christian Song	Nominated
2016	MercyMe	Top Christian Artist	Nominated
2016	"Flawless"	Top Christian Song	Nominated
2018	MercyMe	Top Christian Artist	Won
2018	Lifer	Top Christian Album	Nominated
2018	"Even If"	Top Christian Song	Nominated
2019	MercyMe	Top Christian Artist	Nominated

GMA Dove Awards

- 2002 Song of the Year – "I Can Only Imagine"
- 2002 Pop/Contemporary Recorded Song of the Year – "I Can Only Imagine"
- 2004 Song of the Year – "Word of God Speak"
- 2004 Artist of the Year
- 2004 Group of the Year
- 2004 Pop/Contemporary Song of the Year – "Word of God Speak"
- 2005 Pop/Contemporary Album of the Year – Undone
- 2005 Special Event Album of the Year – The Passion of the Christ: Songs

ASCAP Awards

- 2003 Bart Millard awarded Christian Songwriter of the Year at the 25th annual ASCAP Christian Music Awards.

American Music Awards

- 2004 Favorite Contemporary Inspirational Artist
- 2010 Favorite Contemporary Inspirational Artist

K-Love Fan Awards

- 2026 Song of the Year – "Make It Well" (nominated)
- 2026 Artist of the Year (nominated)
- 2026 Group of the Year

== Tours ==
=== Headlining ===
- Imagine Tour (2004)
- Undone Tour (2005)
- Coming Up to Breathe Tour (2006)
- All That Is Within Me Tour (2007)
- The Generous Mr. Lovewell Tour (2010)
- Greater Than Tour (2015)
- MercyMe Live (2016)
- Lifer Tour (2017)
- Spring Tour (2018)
- Imagine Nation Tour (2019)
- 20/20 Tour (2020)
- Live and Outside Tour (2021)
- Inhale (Exhale) Tour (2021)
- MercyMe Live (2022)
- Always Only Jesus Tour (2023-24)
- MercyMe Live (2025)
- Wonder & Awe Tour (2026)

=== Co-headlining ===
- The Christmas Sessions Tour (2005) (with Steven Curtis Chapman)
- Rock & Worship Roadshow 2009
- Rock and Worship Roadshow (2010)
- Rock and Worship Roadshow (2011)
- Rock and Worship Roadshow (2012)
- Rock and Worship Roadshow (2013)
- Rock and Worship Roadshow (2015)
- Winter Tour (2022) (with Chris Tomlin)
- Fall Tour (2023-24) (with TobyMac & Zach Williams)
- Together Again…Again Tour (2024) (with Crowder & Cochren & Co.)
- Live On Tour (2025) (with Matthew West & TobyMac)

=== Opening ===
- Live Tour (1995) (with Audio Adrenaline)
- The Celebration Tour (2003) (with Michael W. Smith)
