= 10 (MercyMe album) =

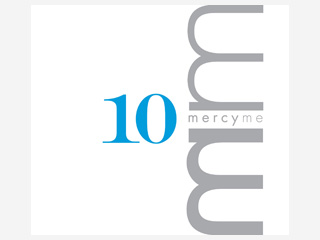

Greatest hits album by MercyMe
- Released: April 7, 2009
- Recorded: 2001–2009
- Genre: Rock
- Label: INO Records
- Producer: Pete Kipley; Brown Bannister; MercyMe

MercyMe chronology
All That Is Within Me (2007)	10 (2009)	The Generous Mr. Lovewell (2010)

10 is a greatest hits album by American Christian rock band MercyMe. Released on April 7, 2009, in commemoration of the tenth anniversary of the band's single "I Can Only Imagine". The album contains twelve of the band's number-one singles from five studio albums (Almost There, Spoken For, Undone, Coming Up to Breathe, and All That Is Within Me) as well as a re-recording of "I Can Only Imagine" featuring the London Session Orchestra, in addition to two other bonus tracks. Additional content, which varies depending on the version of the album, includes music videos, featurettes, and live recordings.

10 received mostly positive reviews from music critics, and the amount of content as well as the videos included with the album received particular praise. It debuted at number 18 on the Billboard 200 and number one on the Billboard Christian Albums chart, selling 30,000 copies in its first week. Billboard ranked the album as the 13th best-selling Christian album of 2009 and the 40th best-selling Christian album of 2010 in the United States.

== Background ==
10 was released to commemorate the tenth anniversary of MercyMe's single "I Can Only Imagine". In 1999, the band was working on an independent record, The Worship Project, and needed one more song to fill out the project. Lead singer Bart Millard wrote the song while reminiscing about his father's death. Although the band was aiming to produce a worship record of easy-to-sing songs, they included it because it was important to Millard. It was later included on the band's major-label debut, 2001's Almost There, where it became a hit on Christian radio before crossing over and becoming successful on mainstream radio in 2003. Around eight months before the release of 10, the band had been approached by their label about producing a greatest-hits record. The band was initially against the idea, and according to Millard, they felt it had always meant a band was near the end of their career. However, Millard later remembered he had written the song in 1999, and the idea shifted from a greatest-hits record to a celebration of the song's ten-year anniversary, a concept the band was more comfortable with.

== Content ==
I Can Only Imagine (Symphony Edition)
"I Can Only Imagine" was re-recorded with London Session Orchestra at Abbey Road Studios. The original version's keyboard riff is translated into the symphony's string track.

=== Music ===
10 includes fifteen songs: twelve of the band's number-one Christian radio singles (three each from Undone, Coming Up to Breathe, and All That Is Within Me, two from Spoken For, and one from Almost There), as well as three bonus tracks. Live versions of ten of the band's songs were also included on some versions of the album "I Can Only Imagine (Symphony Edition)" was recorded at Abbey Road Studios in London with the London Session Orchestra. "Ten Simple Rules", described as having a "Fifties twist" sound, was originally included as music video on Hoop Dogz, a children's video DVD. Lyrically, it relates the Ten Commandments. The band had begun playing it in concerts and, according to Millard, it developed a following of fans who wanted it to be put on CD. "Only Temporary", a rock song with a "distinct southern influence", was a new track, which the band had not included on any other album or project.

=== Videos ===
Physical versions of 10 were released with a 'Sight' DVD containing video content. In addition to music videos for "I Can Only Imagine", "So Long Self", "God with Us", "You Reign", and "Finally Home", it includes live videos for "Word of God Speak", "Bring the Rain", and "Hold Fast" that were recorded live throughout the band's fall 2008 tour by one camera. "Spoken For" and "Homesick" were taken from the band's 2004 live DVD MercyMe Live, while "In the Blink of an Eye" was taken from the collector's edition of their 2007 album All That Is Within Me. Two featurettes were also included: "The Making of 'I Can Only Imagine'", which had previously appeared on MercyMe Live, and "Gospel Music Channel's Faith & Fame: MercyMe", which recounts the band's career from their early years on. The iTunes version of 10 only includes the two featurettes.

== Release and commercial performance ==
10 was released on April 7, 2009. Several different versions of the album were released. Physically, the album received a release in a two-disc collection, featuring the 'Sound' CD and 'Sight' DVD, as well as in a three-disc "Deluxe Edition" including an additional CD of 10 live songs. Digitally, 10 was released to iTunes on October 7, 2009, including the sound CD content and live recordings, as well as the two documentaries.

10 sold 30,000 copies in its first week, debuting at number 18 on the Billboard 200 and number one on the Billboard Christian Albums chart. It spent two weeks atop the Christian Albums chart and 73 weeks on the chart in total. It ranked as the 13th best-selling Christian album of 2009 in the United States and the 40th best-selling Christian album of 2010 in the United States.

== Critical reception ==
Professional ratings
Review scores
Source	Rating
AllMusic	4.5/5 stars
The Baylor Lariat	A−
Cross Rhythms	9/10 squares
Jesus Freak Hideout	3/5 stars
Sight Magazine	(positive)

10 received mostly positive reviews from music critics. Jared Johnson of AllMusic gave the album 4.5 out of 5 stars and noted it as an 'Album Pick', calling it "one of the best and most long-awaited greatest-hits albums in recent memory". Johnson praised the amount of content, saying "For fans, the videos alone make this worth picking up". Jenna DeWitt of The Baylor Lariat gave it an A−, praising "I Can Only Imagine (Symphony Edition)" as "awe-inspiring" as well as the DVD content, and saying "the only mistake in buying this album is if you are really tired of the extensive radio airplay that these hits have gotten". Dave Derbyshire of Cross Rhythms gave the album nine out of ten squares, calling it a "brilliant introduction" to the band. His only criticism on the album was that he considered a few of the songs as being overly sentimental. Matt Johnson of Jesus Freak Hideout gave the album three out of five stars. Johnson noted the DVD content as being "what really makes this worth your money", but was critical of the interface; he also felt the CD content, while solid, did not include enough songs and that the new recordings weren't particularly impressive. He noted the orchestra and Millard's vocals as conflicting on the re-recording of "I Can Only Imagine", but also said that it "takes the song to new heights than previously conceived". Justin Michael of Sight Magazine gave the album a positive review, calling it "A must for all MercyMe fans, for those who need a hooky melody with a message and for people who love getting a free DVD with their albums!"; he also praised the one-camera tour videos, but noted "Ten Simple Rules" is "not their brightest musical moment".

== Track listing ==
Sound CD
No.	Title	Writer(s)	Album	Length
1.	"Here With Me"	Dan Muckala, Brad Russell, Pete Kipley, Bart Millard, Nathan Cochran, Mike Scheuchzer, Jim Bryson, Robby Shaffer, Barry Graul	Undone	4:09
2.	"So Long Self"	Millard, Cochran, Scheuchzer, Bryson, Shaffer, Graul	Coming Up to Breathe	4:03
3.	"God with Us"	Millard, Cochran, Scheuchzer, Bryson, Shaffer, Graul	All That Is Within Me	5:47
4.	"I Can Only Imagine"	Millard	The Worship Project, Almost There	4:08
5.	"Word of God Speak"	Kipley, Millard	Spoken For	3:06
6.	"You Reign"	Steven Curtis Chapman, Millard, Graul	All That Is Within Me	3:50
7.	"In the Blink of an Eye"	Kipley, Millard, Cochran, Scheuchzer, Bryson, Shaffer, Graul	Undone	3:16
8.	"Hold Fast"	Millard, Cochran, Scheuchzer, Bryson, Shaffer, Graul	Coming Up to Breathe	4:38
9.	"Spoken For"	Millard, Cochran, Scheuchzer, Bryson, Shaffer, Kipley	Spoken For	4:08
10.	"Homesick"	Millard	Undone	3:41
11.	"Bring the Rain"	Millard, Cochran, Scheuchzer, Bryson, Shaffer, Graul	Coming Up to Breathe	5:30
12.	"Finally Home"	Millard, Graul, David Campbell	All That Is Within Me	3:29
13.	"I Can Only Imagine (Symphony Edition)"	Millard	New recording	5:01
14.	"Only Temporary"	Millard, Cochran, Scheuchzer, Bryson, Shaffer, Graul	New recording	3:44
15.	"Ten Simple Rules"	Millard, Graul, Campbell	New recording	3:06
Total length:				61:36

Sight DVD
No.	Title	DVD	Length
1.	"In the Blink of an Eye" (Live video)	All That Is Within Me: Collector's Edition	2:59
2.	"You Reign" (Music video)		3:49
3.	"Hold Fast" (Live video)
4.	"So Long Self" (Music video)		4:37
5.	"Finally Home" (Music video)		3:28
6.	"Word of God Speak" (Live video)		11:03
7.	"Spoken For" (Live video)	MercyMe Live	4:49
8.	"Bring the Rain" (Live video)		5:30
9.	"I Can Only Imagine" (Music video)		4:07
10.	"God with Us" (Music video)		4:23
11.	"Homesick" (Live video)	MercyMe Live	3:54
12.	"Gospel Music Channel's Faith & Fame: MercyMe"		22:07
13.	"The Story Behind 'I Can Only Imagine'"	MercyMe Live	9:58
Total length:			80:44

Live CD
No.	Title	Length
1.	"Here with Me (Live)"	3:18
2.	"In the Blink of an Eye (Live)"	3:02
3.	"You Reign (Live)"	3:54
4.	"Hold Fast (Live)"	4:49
5.	"So Long Self (Live)"	4:11
6.	"Finally Home (Live)"	3:28
7.	"Word of God Speak (Live)"	11:06
8.	"Bring the Rain (Live)"	5:20
9.	"I Can Only Imagine (Live)"	5:01
10.	"God with Us (Live)"	6:40
Total length:		50:49

== Personnel ==
Credits from the album liner notes

=== MercyMe ===
- Jim Bryson – keys
- Nathan Cochran – bass guitar
- Barry Graul – guitar
- Bart Millard – lead vocals
- Mike Scheuchzer – guitar
- Robby Shaffer – drums

=== Technical and design ===
- Tony Baker – photography
- Brown Bannister – producer, engineering, digital editing
- Kristin Barlowe – photography
- Steve Bishir – recording, mixing, tracking
- Bob Clearmountain – mixing
- Jeremy Cowart – photography
- Richard Dodd – mastering
- Kent Hooper – keyboard programming, digital editing
- Ted Jensen – mastering
- Pete Kipley – producer
- Shatrine Krake – design and layout
- Stephen Marcussen – mastering
- Carl Marsh – string arrangements, conductor
- Blair Masters – keyboard programming
- Rob Mathes – string arrangements
- MercyMe – producer
- Simon Rhodes – recording (strings)
- Shawn Sanders – photography
- Salvo – mixing
- F. Reid Shippen – mixing
- Derek West – mastering
- Rob Wexler – recording
- Billy Whittinington – digital editing
- Dave Younkman – recording

=== Additional performers ===
- The London Session Orchestra – strings
- Todd Snider – harmonica

=== Video content ===
- Steve Bussel – editing
- Joel Cameron – mixing
- Chris Grainger – recording
- Tameron Hedge – producer
- Kyle Lollis – editing, producer
- Russ Long – recording
- Mark McCallie – director
- MercyMe – producer
- Dan O'Connell – DVD authoring, editing
- Dustin Reynolds – audio recording
- Mike Scheuchzer – audio recording
- Scott Simmons – editing
- Ryan Slaughter – video recording, editing
- Dennis Stams – editing
- Aaron Swihart – recording, mixing
- Eric Walsh – director, editing
- Todd White – editing, producing

== Charts ==
Weekly album charts
Chart (2009)	Peak position
US Billboard 200	18
US Christian Albums (Billboard)	1

Year-end charts
Chart (2009)	Peak position
US Christian Albums (Billboard)	13
Chart (2010)	Peak position
US Christian Albums (Billboard)	40
