= List of Billboard Christian Songs number ones of the 2000s =

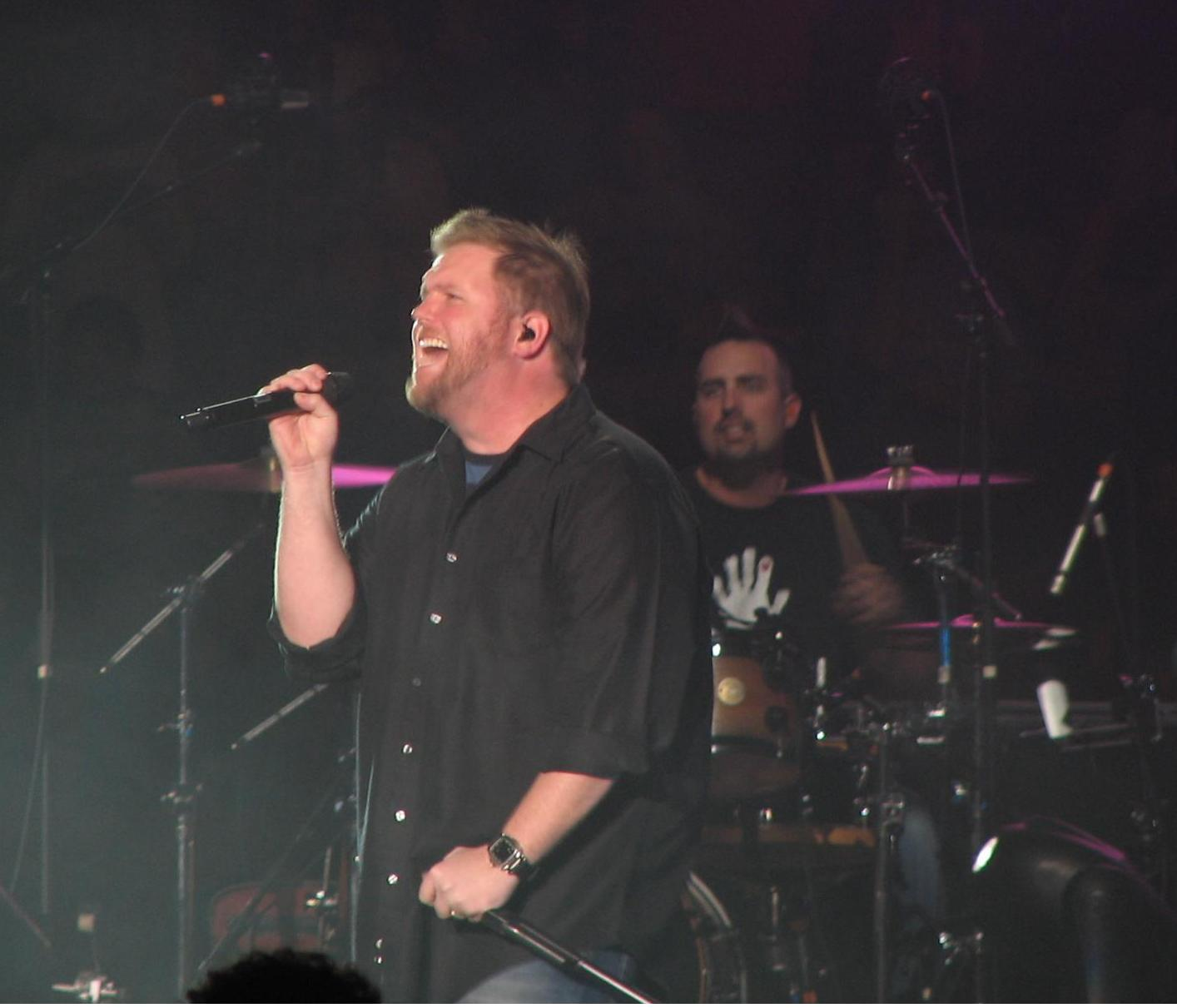
MercyMe recorded seven number-one singles during the decade including "Word of God Speak", the longest-running number-one single of the decade.

The Christian Songs chart is a record chart compiled by Billboard magazine. Launched on June 21, 2003, the chart was ranked during the decade by overall audience impressions (the approximate number of audience impressions made for each play, as determined by BDS data cross-referenced with Arbitron listener information). While the chart covers all Christian radio formats, it is dominated by Christian adult contemporary (Christian AC) radio stations, which cater to a mostly adult audience. As opposed to Christian stations that cater to young audiences, Christian AC stations tend to play hits often and for long periods. As a result, number-one singles on the Christian Songs chart often had lengthy stays at the top position.

During the 2000s, 44 singles reached the number one position on the Christian Songs chart. MercyMe was the most successful group, with seven of their singles topping the chart during the 2000s. The band's "Word of God Speak" was the longest-running number one single of the 2000s, having spent a total of 23 non-consecutive weeks atop the chart. Casting Crowns spent the longest time atop the chart during the decade, as their six number one singles spent a combined total of 62 weeks at the summit. Out of the 44 singles that hit the number-one position during the 2000s, 15 singles spent two separate runs atop the chart. Three singles ("Word of God Speak", "My Savior My God", and "Cry Out to Jesus") returned to the top position for three distinct runs. Nineteen artists recorded number-one singles during the decade. The first number-one single of the 2000s on the chart was Third Day's "You Are So Good to Me", which led the chart's debut week of June 21, 2003, and seven consecutive weeks afterward; the final number-one single was TobyMac's "City On Our Knees", which led the chart for the final eleven weeks of the 2000s, and continued to lead into 2010.

== Number-one singles ==
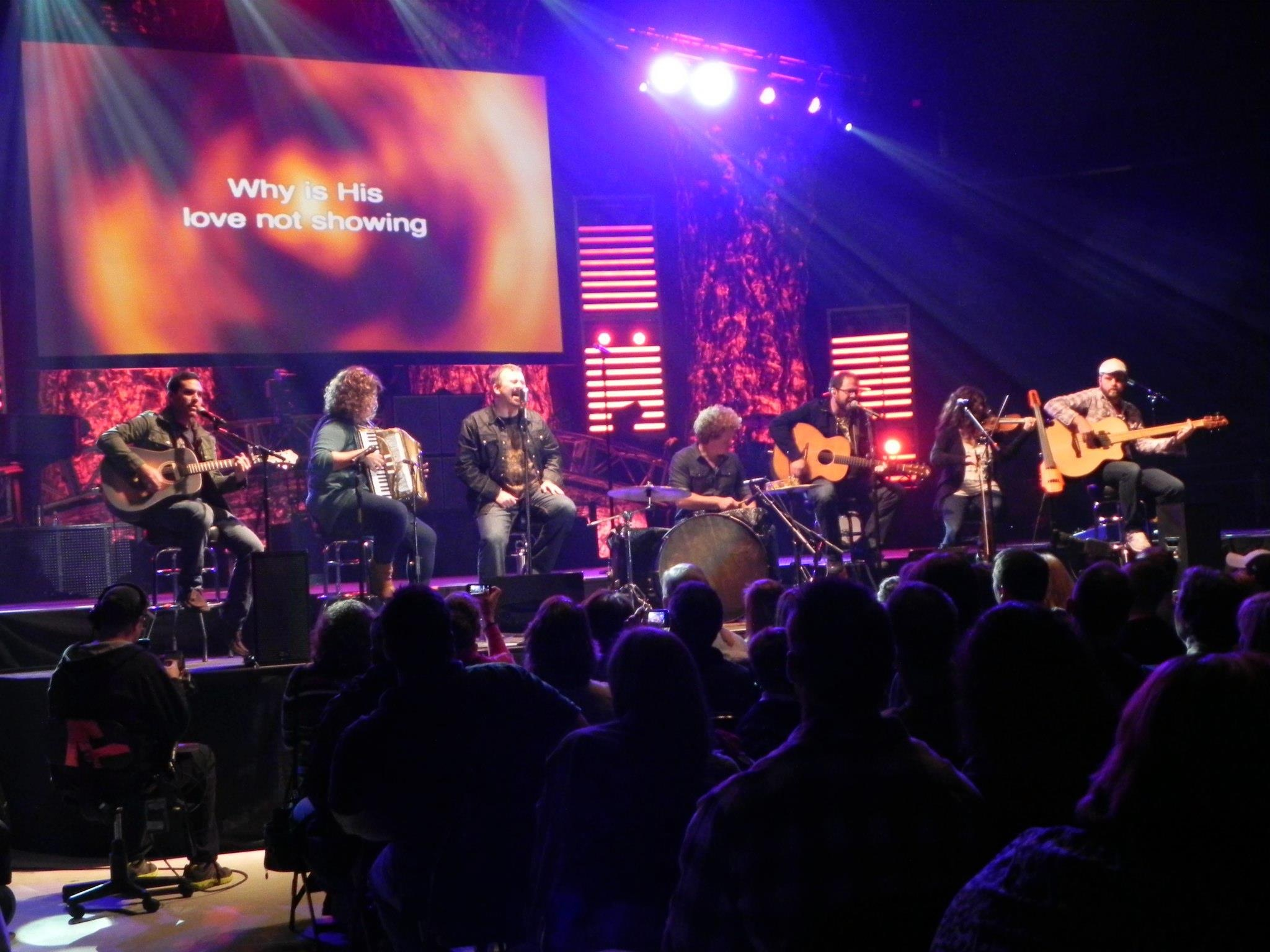
Casting Crowns recorded six number-one singles during the 2000s and spent the longest amount of time (62 weeks) atop the chart.

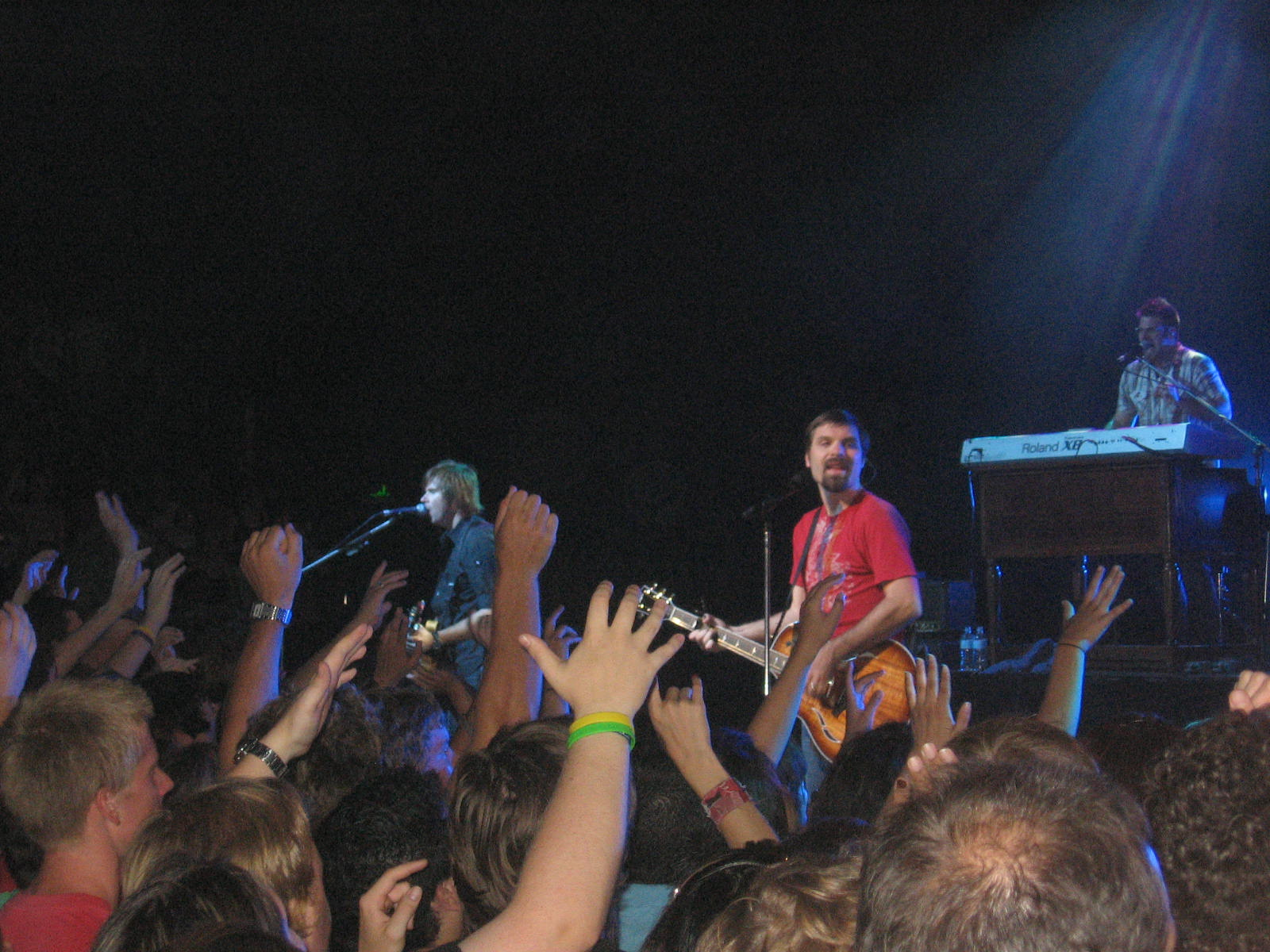
Third Day's "You Are So Good to Me", the first number-one single in the chart's history, spent eight weeks atop the chart in 2003. The band recorded four other number-one singles during the decade.

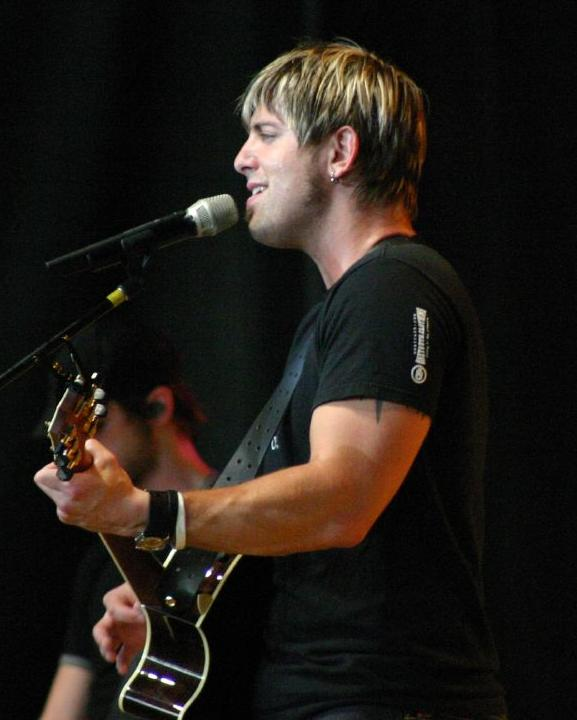
Jeremy Camp recorded five number-one singles during the 2000s including "Take You Back", which spent 15 weeks atop the chart in 2005.

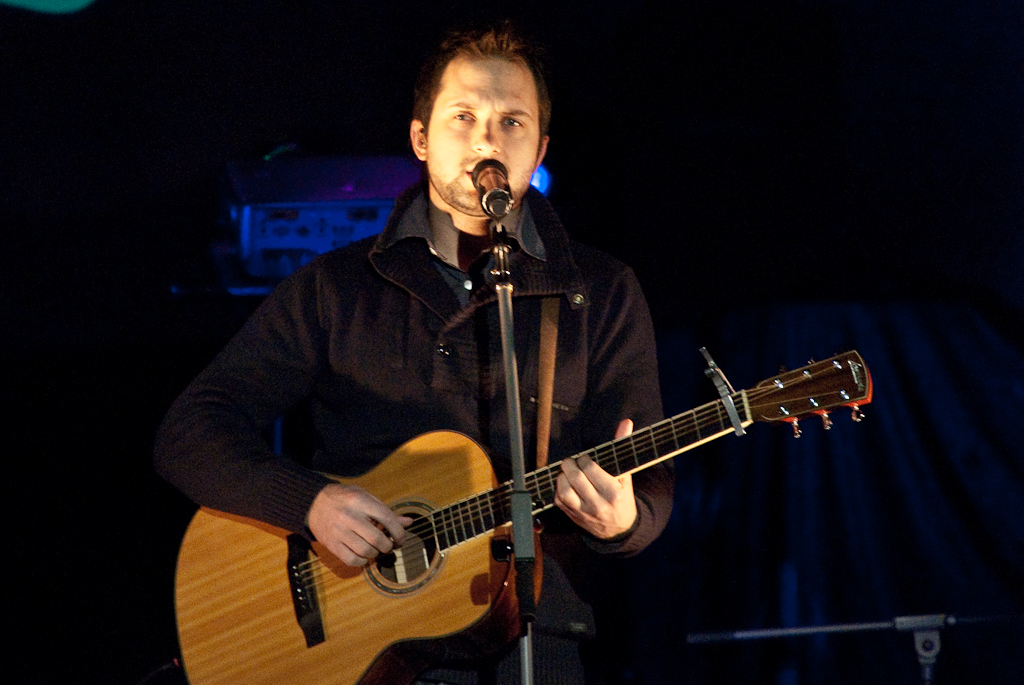
Brandon Heath recorded two number-one hits during the 2000s; his second, "Give Me Your Eyes", spent 19 weeks atop the chart in 2008 and 2009, tied for the second-longest stay atop the chart in the decade.

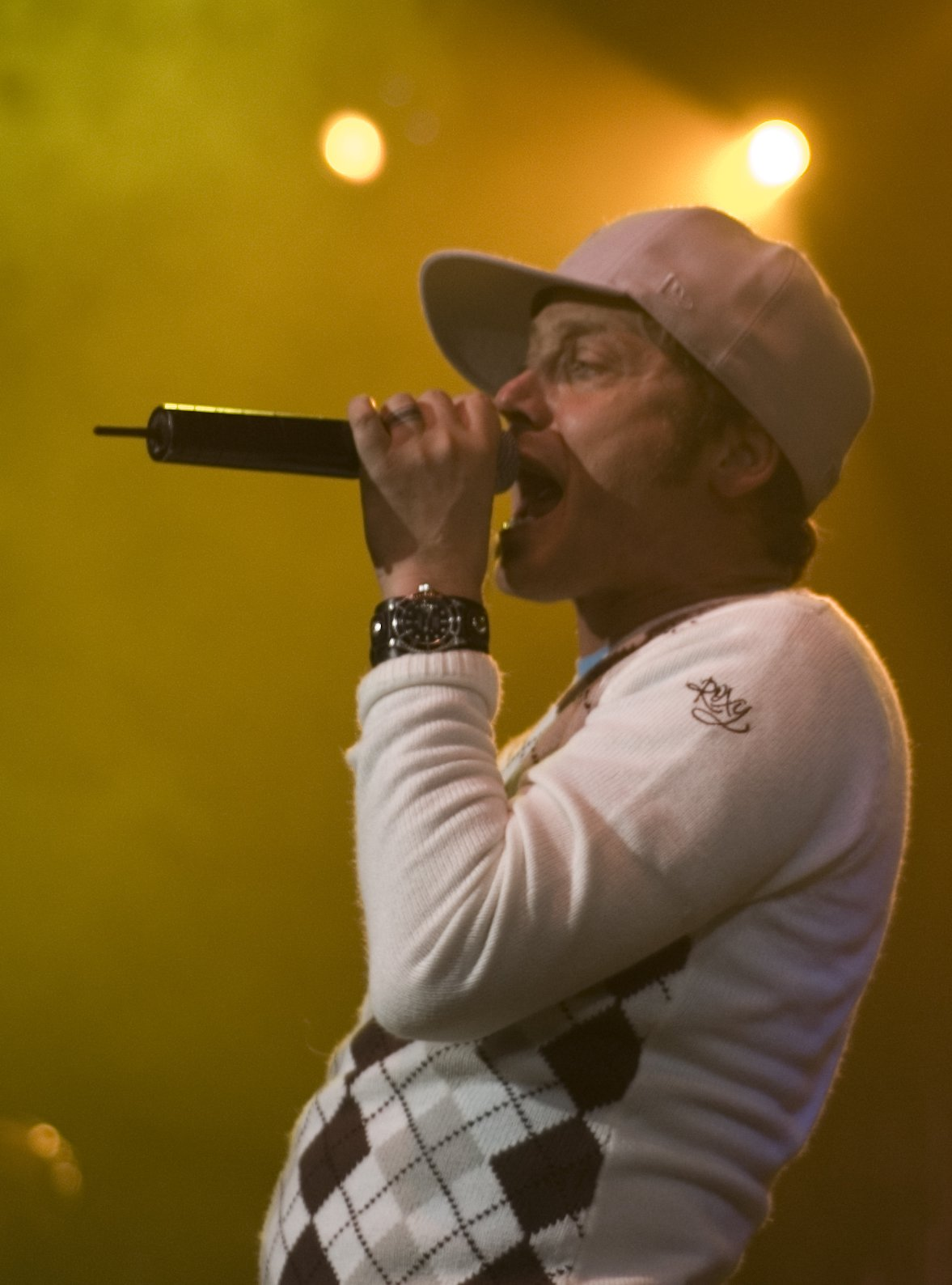
tobyMac's single "City On Our Knees" was the final number-one single of the 2000s.

Key
No.	nth single to top the chart
re	Return of a single to number one

Number-one singles with artist, date, time spent, and references
No.	Issue Date	Artist	Single	Ref.(s)
2003
1	June 21	Third Day	"You Are So Good to Me"	
1	June 28	Third Day	"You Are So Good to Me"	
1	July 5	Third Day	"You Are So Good to Me"	
1	July 12	Third Day	"You Are So Good to Me"	
1	July 19	Third Day	"You Are So Good to Me"	
1	July 26	Third Day	"You Are So Good to Me"	
1	August 2	Third Day	"You Are So Good to Me"	
1	August 9	Third Day	"You Are So Good to Me"	
2	August 16	MercyMe	"Word of God Speak"	
2	August 23	MercyMe	"Word of God Speak"	
2	August 30	MercyMe	"Word of God Speak"	
2	September 6	MercyMe	"Word of God Speak"	
2	September 13	MercyMe	"Word of God Speak"	
2	September 20	MercyMe	"Word of God Speak"	
2	September 27	MercyMe	"Word of God Speak"	
2	October 4	MercyMe	"Word of God Speak"	
2	October 11	MercyMe	"Word of God Speak"	
2	October 18	MercyMe	"Word of God Speak"	
2	October 25	MercyMe	"Word of God Speak"	
2	November 1	MercyMe	"Word of God Speak"	
2	November 8	MercyMe	"Word of God Speak"	
2	November 15	MercyMe	"Word of God Speak"	
2	November 22	MercyMe	"Word of God Speak"	
2	November 29	MercyMe	"Word of God Speak"	
2	December 6	MercyMe	"Word of God Speak"	
2	December 13	MercyMe	"Word of God Speak"	
3	December 20	Newsboys	"You Are My King (Amazing Love)"	
3	December 27	Newsboys	"You Are My King (Amazing Love)"	
2004
3	January 3	Newsboys	"You Are My King (Amazing Love)"	
3	January 10	Newsboys	"You Are My King (Amazing Love)"	
re	January 17	MercyMe	"Word of God Speak"	
re	January 24	Newsboys	"You Are My King (Amazing Love)"	
re	January 31	Newsboys	"You Are My King (Amazing Love)"	
re	February 7	Newsboys	"You Are My King (Amazing Love)"	
re	February 14	MercyMe	"Word of God Speak"	
re	February 21	MercyMe	"Word of God Speak"	
re	February 28	MercyMe	"Word of God Speak"	
re	March 6	MercyMe	"Word of God Speak"	
4	March 13	Third Day	"Sing a Song"	
4	March 20	Third Day	"Sing a Song"	
5	March 27	Matthew West	"More"	
5	April 3	Matthew West	"More"	
5	April 10	Matthew West	"More"	
5	April 17	Matthew West	"More"	
5	April 24	Matthew West	"More"	
5	May 1	Matthew West	"More"	
6	May 8	Building 429	"Glory Defined"	
6	May 15	Building 429	"Glory Defined"	
6	May 22	Building 429	"Glory Defined"	
6	May 29	Building 429	"Glory Defined"	
7	June 5	Casting Crowns	"Who Am I"	
7	June 12	Casting Crowns	"Who Am I"	
7	June 19	Casting Crowns	"Who Am I"	
7	June 26	Casting Crowns	"Who Am I"	
7	July 3	Casting Crowns	"Who Am I"	
7	July 10	Casting Crowns	"Who Am I"	
8	July 17	MercyMe	"Here with Me"	
8	July 24	MercyMe	"Here with Me"	
8	July 31	MercyMe	"Here with Me"	
8	August 7	MercyMe	"Here with Me"	
8	August 14	MercyMe	"Here with Me"	
8	August 21	MercyMe	"Here with Me"	
8	August 28	MercyMe	"Here with Me"	
8	September 4	MercyMe	"Here with Me"	
8	September 11	MercyMe	"Here with Me"	
8	September 18	MercyMe	"Here with Me"	
8	September 25	MercyMe	"Here with Me"	
9	October 2	Jeremy Camp	"Walk by Faith"	
9	October 9	Jeremy Camp	"Walk by Faith"	
re	October 16	MercyMe	"Here with Me"	
re	October 23	MercyMe	"Here with Me"	
10	October 30	By the Tree	"Beautiful One"	
10	November 6	By the Tree	"Beautiful One"	
10	November 13	By the Tree	"Beautiful One"	
10	November 20	By the Tree	"Beautiful One"	
11	November 27	Casting Crowns	"Voice of Truth"	
11	December 4	Casting Crowns	"Voice of Truth"	
11	December 11	Casting Crowns	"Voice of Truth"	
11	December 18	Casting Crowns	"Voice of Truth"	
11	December 25	Casting Crowns	"Voice of Truth"	
2005
11	January 1	Casting Crowns	"Voice of Truth"	
11	January 8	Casting Crowns	"Voice of Truth"	
11	January 15	Casting Crowns	"Voice of Truth"	
11	January 22	Casting Crowns	"Voice of Truth"	
11	January 29	Casting Crowns	"Voice of Truth"	
11	February 5	Casting Crowns	"Voice of Truth"	
11	February 12	Casting Crowns	"Voice of Truth"	
11	February 19	Casting Crowns	"Voice of Truth"	
11	February 26	Casting Crowns	"Voice of Truth"	
12	March 5	Jeremy Camp	"Take You Back"	
12	March 12	Jeremy Camp	"Take You Back"	
12	March 19	Jeremy Camp	"Take You Back"	
12	March 26	Jeremy Camp	"Take You Back"	
12	April 2	Jeremy Camp	"Take You Back"	
12	April 9	Jeremy Camp	"Take You Back"	
12	April 16	Jeremy Camp	"Take You Back"	
12	April 23	Jeremy Camp	"Take You Back"	
12	April 30	Jeremy Camp	"Take You Back"	
12	May 7	Jeremy Camp	"Take You Back"	
12	May 14	Jeremy Camp	"Take You Back"	
12	May 21	Jeremy Camp	"Take You Back"	
12	May 28	Jeremy Camp	"Take You Back"	
12	June 4	Jeremy Camp	"Take You Back"	
12	June 11	Jeremy Camp	"Take You Back"	
13	June 18	Joy Williams	"Hide"	
13	June 25	Joy Williams	"Hide"	
13	July 2	Joy Williams	"Hide"	
13	July 9	Joy Williams	"Hide"	
13	July 16	Joy Williams	"Hide"	
13	July 23	Joy Williams	"Hide"	
13	July 30	Joy Williams	"Hide"	
14	August 6	Nichole Nordeman	"Brave"	
15	August 13	MercyMe	"In the Blink of an Eye"	
15	August 20	MercyMe	"In the Blink of an Eye"	
15	August 27	MercyMe	"In the Blink of an Eye"	
15	September 3	MercyMe	"In the Blink of an Eye"	
15	September 10	MercyMe	"In the Blink of an Eye"	
16	September 17	Casting Crowns	"Lifesong"	
16	September 24	Casting Crowns	"Lifesong"	
16	October 1	Casting Crowns	"Lifesong"	
16	October 8	Casting Crowns	"Lifesong"	
16	October 15	Casting Crowns	"Lifesong"	
16	October 22	Casting Crowns	"Lifesong"	
16	October 29	Casting Crowns	"Lifesong"	
16	November 5	Casting Crowns	"Lifesong"	
16	November 12	Casting Crowns	"Lifesong"	
17	November 19	Third Day	"Cry Out to Jesus"	
17	November 26	Third Day	"Cry Out to Jesus"	
17	December 3	Third Day	"Cry Out to Jesus"	
17	December 10	Third Day	"Cry Out to Jesus"	
re	December 17	Casting Crowns	"Lifesong"	
18	December 24	MercyMe	"Joseph's Lullaby"	
18	December 31	MercyMe	"Joseph's Lullaby"	
2006
18	January 7	MercyMe	"Joseph's Lullaby"	
re	January 14	Third Day	"Cry Out to Jesus"	
re	January 21	Third Day	"Cry Out to Jesus"	
re	January 28	Third Day	"Cry Out to Jesus"	
re	February 4	Third Day	"Cry Out to Jesus"	
19	February 11	Jeremy Camp	"This Man"	
19	February 18	Jeremy Camp	"This Man"	
19	February 25	Jeremy Camp	"This Man"	
19	March 4	Jeremy Camp	"This Man"	
re	March 11	Third Day	"Cry Out to Jesus"	
re	March 18	Third Day	"Cry Out to Jesus"	
20	March 25	Aaron Shust	"My Savior My God"	
20	April 1	Aaron Shust	"My Savior My God"	
21	April 8	Chris Tomlin	"How Great Is Our God"	
re	April 15	Aaron Shust	"My Savior My God"	
re	April 22		"My Savior My God"	
re	April 29		"My Savior My God"	
re	May 6		"My Savior My God"	
re	May 13		"My Savior My God"	
re	May 20		"My Savior My God"	
22	May 27	Casting Crowns	"Praise You In This Storm"	
22	June 3	Casting Crowns	"Praise You In This Storm"	
22	June 10	Casting Crowns	"Praise You In This Storm"	
22	June 17	Casting Crowns	"Praise You In This Storm"	
22	June 24	Casting Crowns	"Praise You In This Storm"	
22	July 1	Casting Crowns	"Praise You In This Storm"	
22	July 8	Casting Crowns	"Praise You In This Storm"	
23	July 15	MercyMe	"So Long Self"	
23	July 22	MercyMe	"So Long Self"	
23	July 29	MercyMe	"So Long Self"	
23	August 5	MercyMe	"So Long Self"	
24	August 12	Third Day	"Mountain of God"	
re	August 19	Aaron Shust	"My Savior My God"	
re	August 26	Aaron Shust	"My Savior My God"	
re	September 2	Aaron Shust	"My Savior My God"	
re	September 9	Third Day	"Mountain of God"	
re	September 16	Third Day	"Mountain of God"	
25	September 23	Chris Tomlin	"Made to Worship"	
25	September 30	Chris Tomlin	"Made to Worship"	
25	October 7	Chris Tomlin	"Made to Worship"	
25	October 14	Chris Tomlin	"Made to Worship"	
25	October 21	Chris Tomlin	"Made to Worship"	
25	October 28	Chris Tomlin	"Made to Worship"	
25	November 4	Chris Tomlin	"Made to Worship"	
25	November 11	Chris Tomlin	"Made to Worship"	
25	November 18	Chris Tomlin	"Made to Worship"	
25	November 25	Chris Tomlin	"Made to Worship"	
25	December 2	Chris Tomlin	"Made to Worship"	
25	December 9	Chris Tomlin	"Made to Worship"	
25	December 16	Chris Tomlin	"Made to Worship"	
25	December 23	Chris Tomlin	"Made to Worship"	
26	December 30	tobyMac	"Made to Love"	
2007
27	January 6	Aaron Shust	"O Come O Come Emmanuel"	
re	January 13	Chris Tomlin	"Made to Worship"	
re	January 20	Chris Tomlin	"Made to Worship"	
re	January 27	Chris Tomlin	"Made to Worship"	
re	February 3	Chris Tomlin	"Made to Worship"	
28	February 10	Casting Crowns	"Does Anybody Hear Her"	
28	February 17	Casting Crowns	"Does Anybody Hear Her"	
28	February 24	Casting Crowns	"Does Anybody Hear Her"	
28	March 3	Casting Crowns	"Does Anybody Hear Her"	
28	March 10	Casting Crowns	"Does Anybody Hear Her"	
28	March 17	Casting Crowns	"Does Anybody Hear Her"	
re	March 24	tobyMac	"Made to Love"	
re	March 31	tobyMac	"Made to Love"	
re	April 7	tobyMac	"Made to Love"	
re	April 14	tobyMac	"Made to Love"	
re	April 21	tobyMac	"Made to Love"	
re	April 28	tobyMac	"Made to Love"	
re	May 5	tobyMac	"Made to Love"	
re	May 12	tobyMac	"Made to Love"	
29	May 19	Rush of Fools	"Undo"	
29	May 26	Rush of Fools	"Undo"	
29	June 2	Rush of Fools	"Undo"	
29	June 9	Rush of Fools	"Undo"	
30	June 16	Big Daddy Weave	"Every Time I Breathe"	
30	June 23	Big Daddy Weave	"Every Time I Breathe"	
30	June 30	Big Daddy Weave	"Every Time I Breathe"	
30	July 7	Big Daddy Weave	"Every Time I Breathe"	
31	July 14	Brandon Heath	"I'm Not Who I Was"	
31	July 21	Brandon Heath	"I'm Not Who I Was"	
31	July 28	Brandon Heath	"I'm Not Who I Was"	
31	August 4	Brandon Heath	"I'm Not Who I Was"	
31	August 11	Brandon Heath	"I'm Not Who I Was"	
31	August 18	Brandon Heath	"I'm Not Who I Was"	
32	August 25	MercyMe	"Bring the Rain"	
33	September 1	Casting Crowns	"East to West"	
33	September 8	Casting Crowns	"East to West"	
33	September 15	Casting Crowns	"East to West"	
33	September 22	Casting Crowns	"East to West"	
33	September 29	Casting Crowns	"East to West"	
33	October 6	Casting Crowns	"East to West"	
33	October 13	Casting Crowns	"East to West"	
33	October 20	Casting Crowns	"East to West"	
33	October 27	Casting Crowns	"East to West"	
33	November 3	Casting Crowns	"East to West"	
33	November 10	Casting Crowns	"East to West"	
33	November 17	Casting Crowns	"East to West"	
33	November 24	Casting Crowns	"East to West"	
33	December 1	Casting Crowns	"East to West"	
33	December 8	Casting Crowns	"East to West"	
33	December 15	Casting Crowns	"East to West"	
34	December 22	MercyMe	"God with Us"	
34	December 29	MercyMe	"God with Us"	
2008
34	January 5	MercyMe	"God with Us"	
re	January 12	Casting Crowns	"East to West"	
re	January 19	Casting Crowns	"East to West"	
re	January 26	Casting Crowns	"East to West"	
re	February 2	MercyMe	"God with Us"	
re	February 9	MercyMe	"God with Us"	
re	February 16	MercyMe	"God with Us"	
re	February 23	MercyMe	"God with Us"	
re	March 1	MercyMe	"God with Us"	
35	March 8	Matthew West	"You Are Everything"	
35	March 15	Matthew West	"You Are Everything"	
35	March 22	Matthew West	"You Are Everything"	
35	March 29	Matthew West	"You Are Everything"	
35	April 5	Matthew West	"You Are Everything"	
35	April 12	Matthew West	"You Are Everything"	
35	April 19	Matthew West	"You Are Everything"	
35	April 26	Matthew West	"You Are Everything"	
36	May 3	Jeremy Camp	"Let It Fade"	
36	May 10	Jeremy Camp	"Let It Fade"	
37	May 17	Needtobreathe	"Washed by the Water"	
37	May 24	Needtobreathe	"Washed by the Water"	
37	May 31	Needtobreathe	"Washed by the Water"	
37	June 7	Needtobreathe	"Washed by the Water"	
38	June 14	Third Day	"Call My Name"	
38	June 21	Third Day	"Call My Name"	
38	June 28	Third Day	"Call My Name"	
38	July 5	Third Day	"Call My Name"	
38	July 12	Third Day	"Call My Name"	
38	July 19	Third Day	"Call My Name"	
38	July 26	Third Day	"Call My Name"	
38	August 2	Third Day	"Call My Name"	
38	August 9	Third Day	"Call My Name"	
38	August 16	Third Day	"Call My Name"	
38	August 23	Third Day	"Call My Name"	
38	August 30	Third Day	"Call My Name"	
38	September 6	Third Day	"Call My Name"	
39	September 13	Brandon Heath	"Give Me Your Eyes"	
39	September 20	Brandon Heath	"Give Me Your Eyes"	
39	September 27	Brandon Heath	"Give Me Your Eyes"	
39	October 4	Brandon Heath	"Give Me Your Eyes"	
39	October 11	Brandon Heath	"Give Me Your Eyes"	
39	October 18	Brandon Heath	"Give Me Your Eyes"	
39	October 25	Brandon Heath	"Give Me Your Eyes"	
39	November 1	Brandon Heath	"Give Me Your Eyes"	
39	November 8	Brandon Heath	"Give Me Your Eyes"	
39	November 15	Brandon Heath	"Give Me Your Eyes"	
39	November 22	Brandon Heath	"Give Me Your Eyes"	
39	November 29	Brandon Heath	"Give Me Your Eyes"	
39	December 6	Brandon Heath	"Give Me Your Eyes"	
39	December 13	Brandon Heath	"Give Me Your Eyes"	
39	December 20	Brandon Heath	"Give Me Your Eyes"	
40	December 27	Jeremy Camp	"There Will Be a Day"	
2009
re	January 3	Brandon Heath	"Give Me Your Eyes"	
re	January 10	Brandon Heath	"Give Me Your Eyes"	
re	January 17	Brandon Heath	"Give Me Your Eyes"	
re	January 24	Brandon Heath	"Give Me Your Eyes"	
re	January 31	Jeremy Camp	"There Will Be a Day"	
re	February 7	Jeremy Camp	"There Will Be a Day"	
re	February 14	Jeremy Camp	"There Will Be a Day"	
re	February 21	Jeremy Camp	"There Will Be a Day"	
re	February 28	Jeremy Camp	"There Will Be a Day"	
re	March 7	Jeremy Camp	"There Will Be a Day"	
re	March 14	Jeremy Camp	"There Will Be a Day"	
re	March 21	Jeremy Camp	"There Will Be a Day"	
re	March 28	Jeremy Camp	"There Will Be a Day"	
41	April 4	Francesca Battistelli	"Free to Be Me"	
41	April 11	Francesca Battistelli	"Free to Be Me"	
41	April 18	Francesca Battistelli	"Free to Be Me"	
42	April 25	Matthew West	"The Motions"	
42	May 2	Matthew West	"The Motions"	
42	May 9	Matthew West	"The Motions"	
re	May 16	Francesca Battistelli	"Free to Be Me"	
re	May 23	Matthew West	"The Motions"	
re	May 30	Matthew West	"The Motions"	
re	June 6	Matthew West	"The Motions"	
re	June 13	Matthew West	"The Motions"	
re	June 20	Matthew West	"The Motions"	
re	June 27	Matthew West	"The Motions"	
re	July 4	Matthew West	"The Motions"	
re	July 11	Matthew West	"The Motions"	
re	July 18	Matthew West	"The Motions"	
re	July 25	Matthew West	"The Motions"	
re	August 1	Matthew West	"The Motions"	
43	August 8	Phillips, Craig and Dean	"Revelation Song"	
43	August 15	Phillips, Craig and Dean	"Revelation Song"	
43	August 22	Phillips, Craig and Dean	"Revelation Song"	
43	August 29	Phillips, Craig and Dean	"Revelation Song"	
43	September 5	Phillips, Craig and Dean	"Revelation Song"	
43	September 12	Phillips, Craig and Dean	"Revelation Song"	
43	September 19	Phillips, Craig and Dean	"Revelation Song"	
43	September 26	Phillips, Craig and Dean	"Revelation Song"	
43	October 3	Phillips, Craig and Dean	"Revelation Song"	
43	October 10	Phillips, Craig and Dean	"Revelation Song"	
44	October 17	tobyMac	"City on Our Knees"	
44	October 24	tobyMac	"City on Our Knees"	
44	October 31	tobyMac	"City on Our Knees"	
44	November 1	tobyMac	"City on Our Knees"	
44	November 8	tobyMac	"City on Our Knees"	
44	November 15	tobyMac	"City on Our Knees"	
44	November 22	tobyMac	"City on Our Knees"	
44	November 28	tobyMac	"City on Our Knees"	
44	December 5	tobyMac	"City on Our Knees"	
44	December 12	tobyMac	"City on Our Knees"	
44	December 19	tobyMac	"City on Our Knees"	
44	December 26	tobyMac	"City on Our Knees"	

== Statistics ==
=== By artist ===
Five artists achieved three or more number-one singles during the 2000s.

Artists by most number-one singles
Artist	Number-one singles
MercyMe	7
Casting Crowns	6
Jeremy Camp	5
Third Day	5
Matthew West	3

Six artists spent 25 or more weeks atop the chart in the 2000s.

Artists by most weeks at number-one
Artist	Number-one singles
Casting Crowns	62
MercyMe	58
Third Day	36
Jeremy Camp	33
Matthew West	28
Brandon Heath	25

=== Songs by total number of weeks at number one ===
Five songs spent at least ten weeks atop the chart in the 2000s.

Number-one singles by amount of time spent at number-one
Song	Weeks at number-one
"Word of God Speak"	23
"Give Me Your Eyes"	19
"East to West"	19
"Made to Worship"	18
"Take You Back"	15

== See also ==
- List of number-one Billboard Christian Songs of the 2010s
