= WOW Worship: Purple =

Compilation album by Various artists
- Released: March 2, 2010
- Genre: CCM, CWM
- Length: 2:21:28
- Label: Word Entertainment

WOW Worship compilation albums chronology
WOW Worship: Aqua (2006)	WOW Worship: Purple (2010)

Professional ratings
Review scores
Source	Rating
AllMusic	2.5/5 stars

WOW Worship: Purple is the seventh Wow Worship album in the WOW series and was released on March 2, 2010. The 30-track double CD release debuted in sixth position on the Billboard Christian albums chart, and peaked at No. 3.

== Track listing ==
Disc One
No.	Title	Writer(s)	Artist (Album)	Length
1.	"Your Grace Is Enough"	Matt Maher, Chris Tomlin	Matt Maher (Empty & Beautiful)	4:24
2.	"Everlasting God"	Brenton Brown, Kenny Riley	Lincoln Brewster (Let the Praises Ring)	4:47
3.	"Shout Unto God"	Joel Houston, Marty Sampson	Michael W. Smith (A New Hallelujah)	3:25
4.	"You Never Let Go"	Beth Redman, Matt Redman	Matt Redman (Beautiful News)	4:47
5.	"Amazing Grace"	Louie Giglio, Tomlin, Traditional	Chris Tomlin (Music Inspired By the Motion Picture Amazing Grace)	4:26
6.	"Mighty to Save"	Ben Fielding, Reuben Morgan	Hillsong United (The I Heart Revolution)	5:21
7.	"Revelation Song"	Jennie Lee Riddle	Kari Jobe (Kari Jobe)	6:02
8.	"Lead Me to the Cross"	Brooke Fraser	Francesca Battistelli (My Paper Heart: Deluxe Edition)	4:33
9.	"Hosanna (Praise is Raising)"	Paul Baloche, Brown	Brenton Brown (Everlasting God)	4:33
10.	"All Because of Jesus"	Steve Fee	Casting Crowns (The Altar and the Door)	4:56
11.	"The Wonderful Cross"	Jesse Reeves, Tomlin, J.D. Walt	Matthew West (WOW Worship: Purple)	5:08
12.	"Your Name"	Baloche, Glenn Packiam	Paul Baloche (A Greater Song)	5:38
13.	"You Reign"	Steven Curtis Chapman, Barry Graul, Bart Millard	MercyMe (All That Is Within Me)	3:51
14.	"New Song We Sing"	Meredith Andrews, Jason Ingram, Keith Everette Smith	Meredith Andrews (The Invitation)	3:54
15.	"Beautiful Jesus"	Ed Cash, Kristian Stanfill	Kristian Stanfill (Attention)	4:12

Disc Two
No.	Title	Writer(s)	Artist (Album)	Length
1.	"I Am Free"	Jonathan Egan	Newsboys (Go)
2.	"Everything Glorious"	David Crowder	David Crowder*Band (Remedy)
3.	"God of this City"	Richard Bleakley, Aaron Boyd, Peter Comfort, Ian Jordan, Peter Kernaghan, Andrew McCann	Chris Tomlin (Hello Love)
4.	"How Great is Our God"	Chris Tomlin, Ed Cash, Jesse Reeves	Hillsong London
5.	"Majesty (Here I Am)"	Stuart Garrard, Martin Smith	Leeland (Majesty: The Worship EP)
6.	"Give Us Clean Hands"	Charlie Hall	Kutless (It Is Well)
7.	"Hosanna"	Brooke Fraser	Selah (You Deliver Me)
8.	"Marvelous Light"	Charlie Hall	Charlie Hall (Flying into Daybreak)
9.	"Song of Hope"	Dan Hamilton, Chase Jenkins, Taylor Johnson, Robbie Seay	Robbie Seay Band (Give Yourself Away)
10.	"Desert Song"	Brooke Fraser	Natalie Grant (Love Revolution)
11.	"You're Worthy of My Praise"	David Ruis	Big Daddy Weave featuring BarlowGirl (What I Was Made For)
12.	"My Savior My God"	Aaron Shust, Dora Greenwell	Aaron Shust (Anything Worth Saying)
13.	"You Are Good"	Israel Houghton	Israel & New Breed (New Season)
14.	"Happy Day"	Tim Hughes, Ben Cantelon	Tim Hughes (Holding Nothing Back)
15.	"Forever Reign"	Reuben Morgan, Jason Ingram	One Sonic Society (One EP)

== Charts ==
Chart	Peak position
Billboard 200	93

== Certifications ==
Region	Certification	Certified units/sales
United States (RIAA)	Gold	500,000^{‡}
^{‡} Sales+streaming figures based on certification alone.
