= The Christmas Sessions =

Studio album by MercyMe
- Released: September 27, 2005
- Recorded: December 2004–Summer 2005
- Studios: Maximedia (Dallas, Texas); Oxford Sound (Nashville, Tennessee); Abbey Road Studios (London, England, UK).
- Genres: Christmas, rock, pop rock
- Length: 44:48
- Label: INO/Epic
- Producers: Brown Bannister; Pete Kipley

MercyMe chronology
Undone (2004)	The Christmas Sessions (2005)	Coming Up to Breathe (2006)

The Christmas Sessions is the first Christmas album by American Christian rock band MercyMe. The album, produced by Brown Bannister, was released on September 27, 2005. The band, who greatly enjoy Christmas, had previously recorded Christmas songs and enjoyed the process so much that they wanted to produce a full-length album. After releasing a studio album in early 2004, they decided to take time off; they realized they could record a Christmas album over that period and began work in December 2004. The band, aiming to produce a rock-oriented album, recruited Bannister, a noted rock producer, to produce it. In addition to one original song, "Joseph's Lullaby", the album consists of covers of both modern and traditional Christmas songs that the band members had listened to when growing up.

Upon its release, The Christmas Sessions received positive reviews from critics. Praise was offered for the album's production qualities, as well as the change in direction for MercyMe and the band's take on the traditional songs. Minor criticism was directed at lead vocalist Bart Millard's vocals, as well as at individual songs. The album reached a peak of number three on the Billboard Christian Albums chart, number ten on the Holiday Albums chart, and number sixty-four on the Billboard 200; it has been certified gold by the Recording Industry Association of America (RIAA). Multiple songs from the album appeared on record charts, including "Joseph's Lullaby", which peaked at number one on the Christian Songs chart; "God Rest Ye Merry Gentlemen" and "Little Drummer Boy" also appeared in the top ten on the chart, peaking at numbers nine and ten, respectively, and "Silent Night" reached a peak of number six on the Adult Contemporary chart.

== Background and recording ==
According to Bart Millard, the lead vocalist for MercyMe, the band enjoys the Christmas season greatly and had recorded songs for compilation albums like WOW Christmas: Green and had liked the process of taking older Christmas songs and altering them; Millard said that the band "had so much fun doing it that we found ourselves wishing we had a Christmas record of our own". After the band released their third studio album Undone in early 2004, they decided to take some time off, and realized they could record a Christmas album over that period. Although MercyMe had started as a rock band, they become associated with the adult contemporary genre after their single "I Can Only Imagine" became successful. In creating The Christmas Sessions, the band incorporated more elements from rock music and other genres; Millard described it as "the most 'rock' album we've done" and noted they did not concern themselves with the album's direction, saying "we didn’t have to worry about which direction we went. We just made the record we wanted to make".

MercyMe began recording the album over Christmas 2004, and put the "finishing touches" on it over the following summer. The band brought in rock producer Brown Bannister, who had previously recorded albums for artists like Amy Grant and Steven Curtis Chapman, to produce both The Christmas Sessions and their next studio album, which would also utilize a rock sound. In selecting songs for The Christmas Sessions the band wanted to cover Christmas songs they had grown up with, but they did write and record one original song, "Joseph's Lullaby". Millard had initially written it as "Mary's Lullaby" but changed the lyrics and key upon suggestion from Bannister's wife, who noted that, being male, it was odd for him to be singing from the perspective of Mary as opposed to Joseph.

== Composition ==
The Christmas Sessions has been described as a rock and pop rock album; influences from country and jazz were also noted. "It Came Upon a Midnight Clear" has been described as being a stadium rock song incorporating musical elements similar to rock bands U2 and Coldplay; "I Heard the Bells On Christmas Day", a power ballad, was also described as being similar to U2 in sound. "Gloria" is a reinterpretation of "Angels We Have Heard on High", modifying the melody of the song's chorus. "God Rest Ye Merry Gentlemen" utilizes a "multilayered arrangement... that sounds as if it were tailored for a Super Bowl halftime show". The song, along with "Little Drummer Boy", begins with a rock-oriented opening before transitioning into a power ballad form.

"Winter Wonderland/White Christmas" is a medley of the two songs, described as being similar to a mix of a Dixieland band with the Beatles. "Christmas Time Is Here" uses brass instruments in its arrangement, similar to that of Chicago-area bands. "Silent Night", which features Amy Grant singing background vocals, has been described as having a country or country pop arrangement. "Away" is an instrumental piece with a simple arrangement. "Joseph's Lullaby", the album's only original song, has been described as "emo-influenced", portraying both the night of Jesus' birth as well as the night after it. The ballad's arrangement features piano and string instruments.

== Critical reception ==
Professional ratings
Review scores
Source	Rating
Allmusic	3.5/5 stars
Christianity Today	4.5/5 stars
Cross Rhythms	8/10 squares
Jesus Freak Hideout	4/5 stars
The New York Times	(positive)

The Christmas Sessions received positive reviews from music critics. Rick Anderson of Allmusic gave the album 3.5 out of 5 stars, praising the album's overall rock tone. Anderson offered a small amount of criticism concerning Millard's vocal delivery, saying he "can be a bit mannered", as well as criticizing the country sound of "Silent Night" as "ill-advised", but he praised the band's version of "I Heard the Bells on Christmas Day". Russ Breimeier of Christianity Today, who gave the album 4.5 out of 5 stars, praised the album's diverse sound. Although he described the band's influences on some songs as being "a little too obvious", Breimeier stated that "MercyMe is clearly improving as a band". Daniel Cunningham of Cross Rhythms awarded the album 8 out of 10 squares, stating that the album exceeded his expectations. He described the album as being "fresh-sounding" and felt the album's mix of older and newer Christmas songs would give it a wide appeal. Jesus Freak Hideout's Spencer Priest gave the album 4 out of 5 stars, praising the album as "outstanding" and feeling that the use of instruments like the trombone, trumpet, and mandolin in some songs made them stand out in comparison to other renditions. Kelefa Sanneh of The New York Times praised the album as a whole, calling it "one of the year's most enjoyable holiday CDs". He also felt the band's musical changes to the traditional songs showed their care for them.

== Commercial performance ==
The Christmas Sessions was released on September 27, 2005. It debuted at number 47 on the Billboard Christian Albums chart and number 175 on the Billboard 200. The album reached a peak of number three on the Christian Albums chart and number 64 on the Billboard 200, and also debuted and peaked at number ten on the Holiday Albums chart. The Christmas Sessions ranked as the twenty-third best-selling Christian album of 2006. It has been certified gold by the Recording Industry Association of America (RIAA), signifying the equivalent of 500,000 albums sold.

The album spawned a number of charting songs. Three songs ("Joseph's Lullaby", "God Rest Ye Merry Gentlemen", and "Little Drummer Boy") charted inside the top ten of the Billboard Christian Songs chart, peaking at number one, nine, and ten, respectively."It Came Upon a Midnight Clear", "Gloria", "O Holy Night", "Silent Night", and "Rockin' Around the Christmas Tree" also appeared on the chart. "Silent Night" peaked at number six on the Adult Contemporary chart, with "Rockin' Around the Christmas Tree", "Joseph's Lullaby", and "God Rest Ye Merry Gentlemen" also charting on that format.

== Track listing ==
Album release
No.	Title	Writer(s)	Length
1.	"It Came Upon A Midnight Clear"	Edmund Sears	4:39
2.	"Gloria"	Traditional	4:13
3.	"God Rest Ye Merry Gentlemen"	Traditional	3:31
4.	"Rockin' Around the Christmas Tree"	Johnny Marks	2:31
5.	"Winter Wonderland/White Christmas"	Felix Bernard, Irving Berlin	3:46
6.	"Christmas Time Is Here"	Vince Guaraldi, Lee Mendelson	3:42
7.	"Silent Night"	Franz Gruber, Joseph Mohr	4:16
8.	"Away" (instrumental)	James R. Murray	2:08
9.	"Little Drummer Boy"	Harry Simeone, Katherine Kennicott Davis, Henry Onorati	3:18
10.	"I Heard the Bells On Christmas Day"	Henry Wadsworth Longfellow, Johnny Marks	5:07
11.	"O Holy Night"	Adolphe Adam, John Sullivan Dwight	3:53
12.	"Joseph's Lullaby"	Brown Bannister, Bart Millard	3:44
Total length:			44:48

== Personnel ==
Credits taken from Allmusic

MercyMe

- Bart Millard – lead vocals, backing vocals (1–6, 8–10, 12)
- Jim Bryson – keyboards (1–10, 12), acoustic piano (11), synthesizer (11), Hammond B3 organ (11)
- Barry Graul – guitars, backing vocals (1–6, 8–10, 12)
- Mike Scheuchzer – guitars
- Nathan Cochran – bass
- Robby Shaffer – drums

Additional musicians

- Blair Masters – acoustic piano (12), keyboard programming (12)
- Paul Franklin – steel guitar (1–10, 12)
- Eric Darken – percussion (1–10, 12)
- Barry Green – trombone (1–10, 12)
- Mike Haynes – trumpet (1–10, 12)
- Carl Marsh – string arrangements (1–10, 12), choir arrangements (1–6, 8–10, 12)
- The London Session Orchestra – strings (1–10, 12)
- Philadelphia Boys Choir and Chorale – choir (1–6, 8–10, 12)
- Drew Cline – backing vocals (1–6, 8–10, 12)
- Travis Cottrell – backing vocals (1–6, 8–10, 12)
- Michael Mellett – backing vocals (1–6, 8–10, 12)
- Mark Nicholas – backing vocals (1–6, 8–10, 12)
- Amy Grant – backing vocals (7)

Production and Technical

- Brown Bannister – producer (1–10, 12)
- Pete Kipley – producer (11)
- Steve Bishir – recording (1–10, 12)
- Aaron Sternke – assistant engineer, digital editing
- F. Reid Shippen – mixing at Sound Stage Studios (Nashville, Tennessee).
- Lee Bridges – mix assistant
- Ted Jensen – mastering at Sterling Sound (New York City, New York).
- Traci Sterling Bishir – production assistant
- David Edmonson – photography
- Luke Edmonson – photography
- Shatrine Krake – art direction, design

== Charts ==
Album charts
Charts (2005)	Peak position
US Billboard 200	64
US Billboard Christian Albums	3
US Billboard Holiday Albums	10

Song charts
Year	Song	Peak chart positions	
Year	Song	US Christ	US AC
2004	"O Holy Night"	24	—
2005	"Joseph's Lullaby"	1	33
2005	"Silent Night"	30	6
2005	"Little Drummer Boy"	10	—
2005	"It Came Upon a Midnight Clear"	22	—
2006	"God Rest Ye Merry Gentlemen"	9	34
2006	"Gloria"	26	—
2006	"Rockin' Around the Christmas Tree"	37	25
