= WOW Worship: Aqua =

Compilation album by Various artists
- Released: April 4, 2006
- Genre: CCM, CWM
- Length: 78:21 (Disc 1); 77:25 (Disc 2)
- Label: Provident Label Group

WOW Worship compilation albums chronology
WOW Worship: Red (2004)	WOW Worship: Aqua (2006)	WOW Worship: Purple (2010)

Professional ratings
Review scores
Source	Rating
Allmusic	3.5/5 stars

WOW Worship: Aqua is the sixth installment in the WOW Worship series. The collection features 33 "powerful worship songs from today's top artists", eight of which were newly recorded for this album. WOW Worship: Aqua was marketed to both the praise and worship lover and to fans of popular artists in Christian music. The album reached #75 on the Billboard 200 chart. The album was certified as gold in 2006 by the Recording Industry Association of America (RIAA).

== Track listing ==
Disc 1

1. Rich Mullins and Bebo Norman - Step by Step – 5:22
2. By The Tree - Beautiful One – 3:59
3. Chris Tomlin - How Great Is Our God – 4:25
4. Natalie Grant - In Christ Alone – 5:33
5. Tree63 - Blessed Be Your Name – 3:49
6. Michael W. Smith - You Are Holy (Prince of Peace) – 5:18
7. Newsboys - He Reigns – 4:55
8. Sonicflood - Here I Am to Worship – 4:02
9. Building 429 - Famous One – 4:10
10. Bethany Dillon - Holy Is the Lord – 4:51
11. Casting Crowns - Who Am I – 5:35
12. Tim Hughes - Be Glorified – 3:41
13. Matt Redman - The Heart of Worship – 6:28
14. BarlowGirl - No One Like You – 3:12
15. Israel and New Breed - You Are Good – 5:27
16. Vicky Beeching - Yesterday, Today and Forever – 3:55
17. Josh Bates - King of Glory – 3:30

Disc 2

1. David Crowder Band - O Praise Him (All This for a King) – 5:46
2. Third Day - Agnus Dei – 4:23
3. Passion Band featuring Christy Nockels - Grace Flows Down – 4:25
4. Big Daddy Weave - Let It Rise – 4:32
5. Rebecca St. James - Forever [alt. ending] – 5:27
6. Jeremy Camp - Wonderful Maker – 4:29
7. Phillips, Craig and Dean - Friend of God – 4:56
8. Kutless - All Who Are Thirsty – 4:15
9. Selah - Wonderful, Merciful Saviour – 4:12
10. Avalon - Indescribable – 4:03
11. Delirious? - My Glorious – 6:14
12. Twila Paris - Days of Elijah – 4:19
13. Amy Grant - El Shaddai – 4:05
14. Darlene Zschech - Worthy Is the Lamb – 6:01
15. Warren Barfield - Alive Forever, Amen – 3:27
16. Pocket Full of Rocks - Falling – 6:37

== Certifications ==
Region	Certification	Certified units/sales
United States (RIAA)	Gold	500,000^{^}
^{^} Shipments figures based on certification alone.
