= All That Is Within Me =

Studio album by MercyMe
- Released: November 20, 2007
- Studio: Cider Mountain Studio (Athol, Idaho); Abbey Road Studios (London)
- Genre: Rock; worship
- Length: 43:51
- Label: INO Records
- Producer: Brown Bannister

MercyMe chronology
Coming Up to Breathe (2006)	All That Is Within Me (2007)	10 (2009)

Singles from All That Is Within Me
- 1. "God with Us" Released: October 25, 2007; 2. "You Reign" Released: May 30, 2008; 3. "Finally Home" Released: December 26, 2008

All That Is Within Me is the fifth studio album by American Christian rock band MercyMe. Produced by Brown Bannister, it was released on November 20, 2007 through INO Records. The album, intended by the band to be a worship album split between covers and original songs, was recorded following the band's tour with Audio Adrenaline in promotion of their previous studio album Coming Up to Breathe (2006). Although the band intended to write material for a new album during the tour, they had only written one song by the time they entered their recording studio, Cider Mountain Studio in Athol, Idaho. The band wrote so many songs at the studio that they decided not to include any cover songs; all of the songs on the album but one were written or co-written by the band. The album was described as being a rock and worship album, being aimed directly at a Christian audience.

All That Is Within Me received mostly positive reviews from critics, some of which considered it MercyMe's best record to that point. However, some critics felt the album was too similar to the band's previous works. The album sold 84,000 copies in its first week, debuting at number one on the Billboard Christian Albums chart and number 15 on the Billboard 200. Three singles were released to radio: "God with Us", which spent eight weeks at number one on the Billboard Christian Songs chart, "You Reign", which peaked at number two on the Christian Songs chart and spent four weeks atop the Billboard Christian AC Songs chart, and "Finally Home", which peaked at number three on the Christian Songs chart and number 16 on the Billboard Adult Contemporary chart. All That Is Within Me has been certified Gold by the Recording Industry Association of America (RIAA), signifying shipments of over 500,000 copies.

== Background and recording ==
In 2007, MercyMe went on tour with Audio Adrenaline. According to lead singer Bart Millard, the band had initially intended to record something akin to "a full-blown Third Day-style worship album, where part of it was cover tunes, and part of it stuff we've written ourselves". Although Millard noted the band had more than enough time to write material, they had a difficult time doing so because they were "having so much fun" during the tour. By May, the deadline was nearing for the band to begin studio recording The band began having jam sessions, and Millard would look over the material later in the day to try and write lyrics to. By the time the band went to the studio, they had only one complete song and some ideas for choruses on other songs. As with Coming Up to Breathe, the band decided not to record the album in Nashville or their hometown of Dallas. They chose Cider Mountain Studio, located on a ranch in rural Idaho, and "drew inspiration and motivation from the 'beautiful' surroundings." Strings were recorded at Abbey Road Studios in London by the London Session Orchestra.

The band ultimately wrote so many songs while in the studio that they ditched the idea of including any cover material. All of the songs on All That Is Within Me were written by the band, with the exception of "You Reign", which they co-wrote with Steven Curtis Chapman. The final song to be recorded for the album, it resulted from Millard had contacting Chapman over the Internet. He sent Millard some few recordings of songs he had failed to complete while working on his own record. Upon getting to what would become "You Reign", Millard was interested by the verse, and paired it with a chorus that he had previously written but could never write a verse for; the chorus Chapman had originally written for the song became its bridge.

== Composition ==
Goodbye Ordinary
The album's first track, "Goodbye Ordinary", was noted as being similar to the work of the Beatles and including "driving guitar licks" and "lush instrumentation".

Finally Home
Described as the album's "crowning moment", "Finally Home" utilizes the acoustic guitar and relates lyrically to heaven.

All That Is Within Me has been described as a rock and worship album. The album presents a "[return] to a church-focused theme" in comparison to the band's previous albums, which had crossover appeal to mainstream radio. Lyrically, it adopts a more "exuberant" and "defiant" tone in comparison to the band's previous albums, which had reflected the "personal tragedies" the band had endured, while the album's production was noted as being "smooth" and "clean".

"Goodbye Ordinary" was noted as being similar to the work of the Beatles, incorporating "guitars, a distorted B-3 organ, strings, and horns" and "driving guitar licks". Lyrically, the song urges the listener to "live like there's no tomorrow"; the lyrics were noted as being among the least overtly religious songs on the album, being compared to Switchfoot's "Meant to Live" and Stacie Orrico's "(There's Gotta Be) More to Life". "Time Has Come" is described as being "classic rock" and "modern rock", lyrically focusing on the church as being the children of God. "I Know" features a piano track similar to British alternative rock band Keane, while "God with Us", described as a "six-minute marathon", ponders why God would pay attention to man. "Sanctified" is an adult contemporary song. "You Reign", a worship song, incorporates a gospel choir towards its conclusion.

"Grace Tells Us Another Story" lyrically focuses on the love of God, saying that "We've been told the heart is just too far gone to save, but grace tells us another story", and was noted as having a "vaguely Keane-ish Brit-pop quality". "Alright" was noted as being a "sunny pop" song while "My Heart Will Fly" was described as "reflective", asking "Why write the script with such an aching pain? Could there not have been an easier way?". "Finally Home", described as being acoustic and having "country radio's wholesome persona", it relates lyrically to heaven. It begins with Millard reuniting with his father, before shifting to the throne of God.

== Release and promotion ==
All That Is Within Me was released on November 20, 2007. A "Collector's Edition" of the album was released alongside the standard version, including additional content such as acoustic versions of three songs from the album, six live videos, and interviews with the band. It sold 84,000 copies in its first week, the band's best sales week to date. The album debuted at number one on the Billboard Christian Albums chart and number 15 on the Billboard 200. It ranked as the third best-selling Christian album of 2008 in the United States and the 35th best-selling Christian Albums of 2009 in the United States. It was certified Gold by the Recording Industry Association of America (RIAA) on April 20, 2010, signifying shipments of over 500,000 copies.

Three singles were released in promotion of All That Is Within Me. The album's lead single, "God with Us", was released as a digital download on October 25, 2007. It spent eight weeks atop the Billboard Christian Songs chart and ten weeks atop the Billboard Christian AC Songs chart. It ranked at number 12 on the decade-end Christian AC Songs chart and number 19 on the decade-end Christian Songs chart. The album's second single, "You Reign", was released to radio on May 30, 2008. It spent four weeks at number one on the Christian AC Songs chart and peaked at number two on the Christian Songs chart. It ranked at number 35 on the decade-end Christian Songs chart and number 49 on the decade-end Christian AC Songs chart. "Finally Home" was released on December 26, 2008 as the album's third single. It peaked at number two on the Christian AC Songs chart, number three on the Christian Songs chart, and number 16 on the Billboard Adult Contemporary chart. It ranked at number 71 on the decade-end Christian AC Songs chart.

== Critical reception and accolades ==
Professional ratings
Review scores
Source	Rating
AllMusic	4.5/5 stars
Billboard	(positive)
CCM Magazine	4/5 stars
Charisma	(positive)
Christianity Today	2.5/5 stars
Cross Rhythms	9/10 squares
Jesus Freak Hideout	3.5/5 stars

All That Is Within Me received mostly positive reviews from music critics, some of which considered it to be MercyMe's best record to that point. However, some critics considered the album as being too similar to the band's previous works. Jared Johnson of AllMusic gave the album 4.5 out of 5 stars, saying "regardless of whether the credit goes to the change of scenery or the backs-against-the-wall pressure, it is impossible to deny that this is the group's best effort to date" and praised Millard's vocals as well as the album's "sparkling array of musical styles". Deborah Evans Price of Billboard noted the album's shift toward music geared towards the church, and said "No matter what tag the industry puts on these guys, the bottom line is that they continually make great music with broad-based appeal". Mike Parker of CCM Magazine gave it four out of five stars, called it an "exuberant, defiant, stand-up-and-shake-your-fist at-the-devil, rock & roll worship album" and "MercyMe's best work to date". Cameron Conant of Charisma praised Millard's vocals as having "a wonderful pop-country style that seems to get better as this album goes along" and saying "All 10 songs on this album prove that it's no accident MercyMe has sold millions of records... It's catchy pop music with a clear gospel message that will resonate with all of MercyMe's fans—a considerable group—and should win them a few new ones, too".

Tony Cummings of Cross Rhythms gave All That is Within Me 9 out of 10 stars, calling it "the Texas group's best album for years, crammed as it is with well crafted songs of faith and worship and produced with considerable skill by Brown Bannister". Lauren Summerford of Jesus Freak Hideout gave the album 3.5 out of 5 stars, praising it as a strong effort but also saying that it is "nothing out of the ordinary" for the band. Russ Breimeier of Christianity Today gave it 2.5 out of 5 stars, saying it "demonstrates why artists shouldn't be rushed: the album simply doesn't live up to the better moments from MercyMe's previous recordings". Although he praised the band as being one of the best adult contemporary and pop rock bands, he described it as being a "side-step" and having an "overall thrown-together feel".

"You Reign" was nominated for Song of the Year at the 40th GMA Dove Awards and for "Best Gospel Song" at the 51st Grammy Awards.

== Track listing ==
(All songs written by MercyMe except for "You Reign", which was written by MercyMe and Steven Curtis Chapman)

No.	Title	Length
1.	"Goodbye Ordinary"	4:22
2.	"Time Has Come"	4:20
3.	"I Know"	4:20
4.	"God with Us"	5:52
5.	"Sanctified"	4:57
6.	"You Reign"	3:50
7.	"Grace Tells Another Story"	3:41
8.	"Alright"	4:52
9.	"My Heart Will Fly"	4:07
10.	"Finally Home"	3:30

iTunes bonus tracks
No.	Title	Length
11.	"Sanctified (Acoustic version)"	4:25
12.	"I Can Only Imagine (Live in Hawaii)"	10:21
13.	"Bring the Rain (Live in Hawaii)"	6:48
14.	"All That is Within Me Press Kit"	3:44

Collector's Edition bonus tracks
No.	Title	Length
11.	"God With Us (Acoustic version)"	4:27
12.	"Sanctified (Acoustic version)"	4:25
13.	"Finally Home (Acoustic version)"	3:28
14.	"MercyMe Live in Hawaii Concert"	37:36
15.	"Making of All That is Within Me"	7:23
16.	"All That is Within Me Press Kit"	3:24

== Personnel ==
(Credits from the album liner notes)

MercyMe

- Bart Millard – lead vocals, backing vocals
- Jim Bryson – keyboards, acoustic piano
- Barry Graul – guitars
- Mike Scheuchzer – guitars
- Nathan Cochran – bass
- Robby Shaffer – drums

Additional performers

- Blair Masters – keyboard programming
- Eric Darken – percussion
- Mike Haynes – trumpet
- Carl Marsh – string arrangements and conductor
- The London Session Orchestra – strings

Production and Technical

- Brown Bannister – producer, additional engineer
- Steve Bishir – recording, string recording, additional engineer, mixing (10)
- Aaron Sternke – additional engineer, digital editing
- Billy Whittington – additional engineer, digital editing
- Chris Phillips – recording assistant
- F. Reid Shippen – mixing (1–9)
- Buckley Miller – mix assistant (1–9)
- Ted Jensen – mastering
- Shatrine Krake – art direction, design
- Jeremy Cowart – photography
- Sheila Curtis – grooming
- Amber Lehman – styling
- BrickHouse Management – management
- Overdubbed at Townsend Sound Studios (Nashville, Tennessee).
- Mixed at Sound Stage Studios and Townsend Sound Studios (Nashville, Tennessee).
- Mastered at Sterling Sound (New York City, New York).

== Charts and certifications ==
Weekly album charts
Chart (2007)	Peak position
US Billboard 200	15
US Christian Albums (Billboard)	1
Chart (2009)	Peak position
US Top Pop Catalog Albums (Billboard)	6

Year-end charts
Chart (2008)	Peak position
US Billboard 200	131
US Christian Albums (Billboard)	3
Chart (2009)	Peak position
US Christian Albums (Billboard)	35

Certifications
Country	Certification	Units shipped
United States	Gold	500,000
