= God with Us (song) =

"God With Us"

Single by MercyMe

from the album All That Is Within Me
- Released: 19 October 2007
- Recorded: 2007 in the United States (Note: According to the inner liner notes of the album.): Cider Mountain Studio (Athol, Idaho)
- Genre: Christian rock, worship
- Length: 5:52 (album version); 4:23 (music video)
- Label: INO Records
- Songwriters: Bart Millard, Barry Graul, Nathan Cochran, Jim Bryson, Robin Shaffer, Mike Scheuchzer
- Producer: Brown Bannister

MercyMe singles chronology
"Bring the Rain" (2007)	"God With Us" (2007)	"You Reign" (2008)

Music video
- "God With Us" on YouTube

"God With Us" is a song written and performed by Christian rock band MercyMe. The song is lyrically a worship song, inspired by a question used by lead singer Bart Millard's pastor.

Released as the lead single from MercyMe's 2007 album All That Is Within Me, "God With Us" peaked at No. 1 on both the Hot Christian Songs and Hot Christian AC charts, and was ranked at No. 3 and No. 4 on the 2008 year-end charts, respectively. The song also ranked at No. 12 on the decade-end Hot Christian AC chart, and No. 19 on the decade-end Hot Christian Songs chart.

== Background ==
"God with Us" was the first song written for MercyMe's album All That Is Within Me, as well as the song the band based the rest of the album around. The song's lyrics were inspired by the question "Why does God look our way?", which the band's lead singer Bart Millard's pastor used to ask to his congregation. Millard could not get this idea out of his head, and wanted to create a song around this idea. "God with Us" was designed for the church, as well as to be used in worship.

"God with Us" was written and composed by MercyMe. It was produced by Brown Bannister, and the strings on the song were recorded by the London Session Orchestra.

== Composition ==
God With Us
A 21-second audio sample of chorus from "God with Us".

"God With Us" is a worship song with a length of five minutes and 52 seconds. It is set in common time and in the key of B major, with a moderate tempo of 92 beats per minute, and a vocal range spanning from A_{3}–E_{5}.

== Critical reception ==
Critical reception to "God With Us" was generally positive. Mike Parker of Today's Christian Music commented that ""God With Us", a superlative, six-minute marathon, may be the best cut on the album", also opining that "With plenty of time to sink its teeth into the song, the band delivers more emotion than on any tune since “I Can Only Imagine". Kevin McNeese of New Release Tuesday called the song a "worship-filled moment", while Jay Heilman of Christian Music Review opined that the song is "a reminder of how compassionate and loving the Lord is of us".

== Commercial performance ==
"God With Us" debuted at No. 17 on the Billboard Hot Christian Songs chart. It advanced to No. 13 in its second week, and to No. 8 in its third. In its fifth chart week, "God With Us" advanced to No. 4, a spot it held for an additional two weeks. In its ninth chart week, the song advanced to No. 1, a spot it held for three weeks before being supplanted by "East to West" by Casting Crowns. The song dropped to No. 2 in its 12th chart week and held that spot for three weeks before advancing back into No. 1 and holding at that spot for five weeks. In its 20th chart week, "God With Us" fell to No. 2, removed from the top spot by Matthew West's "You Are Everything", and held that spot for three weeks. "God With Us" dropped out of the top five in its 29th chart week, falling to No. 6, and dropped out of the top 10 in its 35th chart week. In all, "God With Us" spent a total of 38 weeks on the Hot Christian Songs chart, eight of them at No. 1.

"God With Us" also peaked at No. 1 on the Hot Christian AC chart, and spent a total of 38 weeks on the chart. In Billboard's 2008 year-end charts, "God With Us" ranked at No. 3 on the Hot Christian Songs chart; only "You Are Everything" by Matthew West and "Call My Name" by Third Day ranked higher. Billboard also ranked the song at No. 4 on the year-end Hot Christian AC chart, with only "You Are Everything" by Matthew West, "Let It Fade" by Jeremy Camp, and "Call My Name" by Third Day ranking higher. The song ranked on Billboard's 2000s decade-end charts, at No. 12 on the Hot Christian AC chart and No. 19 on the Hot Christian Songs chart.

== Live performances ==
MercyMe has performed "God with Us" live on concert tours. At the concert which took place on 4 November 2011 at the Van Andel Arena in Grand Rapids, Michigan, the band performed "God with Us" as part of their setlist. At a concert in Council Bluffs, Iowa, the band, dressed in suits designed around their then-upcoming album The Generous Mr. Lovewell, performed "God with Us" as the final song of their setlist. At a concert in Huntsville, Alabama, MercyMe performed "God with Us" as part of their setlist.

== Other uses ==
"God with Us" has been included in several compilation albums, such as WOW Hits 2009 and Wow #1s: 30 #1 Christian Hits!. MercyMe included both the song and a live version of the song on their 2009 compilation album 10.

== Music video ==
A music video was released for "God With Us". The video features MercyMe performing in a live setting.

== Personnel ==
Instrumental and composition adapted from Allmusic, writing credits adapted from sheet music

- Bart Millard – lead vocals, writer, composer
- Jim Bryson – keyboards, piano, writer, composer
- Nathan Cochran – bass guitar, writer, composer
- Barry Graul – guitar, writer, composer
- Mike Scheuchzer – guitar, writer, composer
- Robby Shaffer – drums, writer, composer
- The London Session Orchestra – strings

== Charts ==
=== Weekly charts ===
Chart (2007–2008)	Peak position
Billboard Hot Christian Songs	1
Billboard Hot Christian AC	1

=== Year-end charts ===
Chart (2008)	Position
Billboard Hot Christian Songs	3
Billboard Hot Christian AC	4

=== Decade-end charts ===
Chart (2000s)	Position
Billboard Hot Christian AC	12
Billboard Hot Christian Songs	19
