= Hold Fast (song) =

Single by MercyMe

from the album Coming Up to Breathe
- Released: September 2006
- Recorded: 2006
- Genre: Christian rock Contemporary Christian
- Length: 4:38
- Label: INO
- Songwriters: Bart Millard, Barry Graul, Jim Bryson, Nathan Cochran, Mike Scheuchzer, Robby Shaffer
- Producer: Brown Bannister

MercyMe singles chronology
"So Long Self" (2006)	"Hold Fast" (2006)	"Bring the Rain" (2007)

Hold Fast is a song written and recorded Christian rock band MercyMe. It was released as the second single from their 2006 album Coming Up to Breathe.

== Composition ==
"Hold Fast" is a Christian rock song with a length of four minutes and thirty-eight seconds. The song was written and composed by Bart Millard, Barry Graul, Jim Bryson, Nathan Cochran, Mike Scheuchzer, and Robby Shaffer, and was produced by Brown Bannister.

The song is set in the key of B♭ and has a heavy rock tempo of 80 beats per minute, with a vocal range spanning from F_{4}-G_{5}. The song has a build-up in the bridge that has been described as 'powerhouse'. The sound of the song has evoked comparisons to Coldplay.

== Reception ==
=== Critical reception ===
"Hold Fast" received generally positive critical reception. Steve Losey of Allmusic commented that the song "is rock with polish" and that "Nathan Cochran's bass groove not only sounds heavy but its very tone exudes sweat". He also opined that "The mid-song bridge shows the band at their pinnacle when the guitars build to Millard's intense vocals". Russ Breimier of Christianity Today commented that the song "initially sounds much like [MercyMe's] usual balladry, but then relies on heavier guitars and a powerhouse build during the bridge (a la Coldplay), as well as some clever lyrics to address the intended audience".

=== Chart performance ===
"Hold Fast" debuted at No. 23 on the Hot Christian Songs chart for the chart week of October 28, 2006. In its sixth chart week the song advanced to No. 6, but dropped to No. 10 the next week. In its eighth chart week "Hold Fast" dropped out of the top ten entirely, falling to No. 12. The song dropped to No. 16 in its tenth chart week, and then to No. 24 in its eleventh, but jumped to No. 3 in its twelfth chart week. The song held the spot for a further three weeks before dropping to No. 4 in its sixteenth chart week. The song spent a total of twenty-five weeks on the chart before dropping out.

On the Adult Contemporary chart, "Hold Fast" debuted at No. 28 for the chart week of April 4, 2007, It achieved its peak position of No. 27 in its fifth chart week, and spent a total of eight weeks on the chart.

== Uses ==
"Hold Fast" is also features of the compilation album WOW Hits 2008, and the 2009 compilation album 10.

== Charts ==
=== Weekly charts ===
Chart (2007)	Peak Position
US Hot Christian Songs (Billboard)	3
US Adult Contemporary (Billboard)	27

=== Year-end charts ===
Chart (2007)	Position
Billboard Hot Christian AC	17
U.S. Billboard Hot Christian Songs	21

=== Decade-end charts ===
Chart (2000s)	Position
Billboard Hot Christian AC	70
