= Coming Up to Breathe =

Studio album by MercyMe
- Released: April 25, 2006
- Recorded: 2005
- Studios: Allaire Studios, Abbey Road Studios
- Genres: Christian rock, alternative rock, pop rock
- Length: 65:15
- Label: INO
- Producer: Brown Bannister

MercyMe chronology
Undone (2004)	Coming Up to Breathe (2006)	All That Is Within Me (2007)

Singles from Coming Up to Breathe
- 1. "So Long Self" Released: March 18, 2006; 2. "Hold Fast" Released: September 4, 2006; 3. "Bring the Rain" Released: March 24, 2007

Alternative covers
- Acoustic version

Coming Up to Breathe is the fourth studio album by Christian rock band MercyMe. Released on April 25, 2006, by INO Records, the album was intended by MercyMe to be edgier than their previous albums. Coming Up to Breathe sold 58,000 copies its first week, MercyMe's biggest sales week at the time. It debuted and peaked at number one on the Billboard Christian Albums chart, number five on the Rock Albums chart, and number thirteen on the Billboard 200. It also appeared on the Alternative Albums chart in 2007, peaking at number thirteen. Coming Up to Breathe was certified Gold by the Recording Industry Association of America (RIAA) in 2007, signifying shipments of over 500,000 copies.

Coming Up to Breathe received positive reviews from critics. It was also nominated for Best Pop/Contemporary Gospel Album at the 49th Grammy Awards, and for Pop/Contemporary Album of the Year at the 38th GMA Dove Awards. The song "Bring the Rain" was nominated for Song of the Year at the 39th GMA Dove Awards.

Three singles were released in promotion of Coming Up to Breathe. Lead single "So Long Self" peaked at number one on the Christian Songs chart, spending four weeks atop that chart. The second single from the album, "Hold Fast", peaked at number three on the Christian Songs chart. The third and final single from the album, "Bring the Rain", spent one week at number one on the Christian Songs chart. "So Long Self" and "Hold Fast" also appeared on the Adult Contemporary chart, peaking at number sixteen and number twenty-seven, respectively.

== Background ==
According to lead vocalist Bart Millard, MercyMe had started as a rock band and had wanted to make a rock record. Following the success of their breakthrough single "I Can Only Imagine", a ballad, they were advised to "duplicate ['I Can Only Imagine'] on the next two records". Millard says they felt that they were at a point where "we are known more for ballads than the rock band we wanted to be". With the consent of their label, which felt there was a trend towards heavier music, MercyMe decided to make an "edgier" record. In particular the band focused on up-tempo songs; Millard noted that while the songs are still pop rock songs, the band tried to put a bit more edge into them. Additionally, the band decided to work with producer Brown Bannister, who had produced the group's Christmas record and Millard's solo album Hymned No. 1, as opposed to Pete Kipley, who had produced the band's previous three albums. Bannister's producing style was different from Kipley's; while Kipley was a hands-on producer, "involved in every part of the song", Bannister would wait until the band had "run down all [their] avenues" before giving input. The band felt Bannister was an "amazing encourager" and were satisfied with the Christmas album Bannister had produced with them; although they felt Kipley did a great job on their previous records, improving themselves as a band and as songwriters, they felt it was "time for a change". Another factor in the decision to use Bannister was his previous recording experience; Bannister had produced one of Millard's favorite albums, White Heart's 1989 album Freedom. The different approach the band took with Bannister resulted in a sometimes "radical" approach, with the band "taking songs apart, putting them back together and, at times, totally reinventing them". One song, "Something About You", shifted from "an aggressive rock song to a soaring anthem".

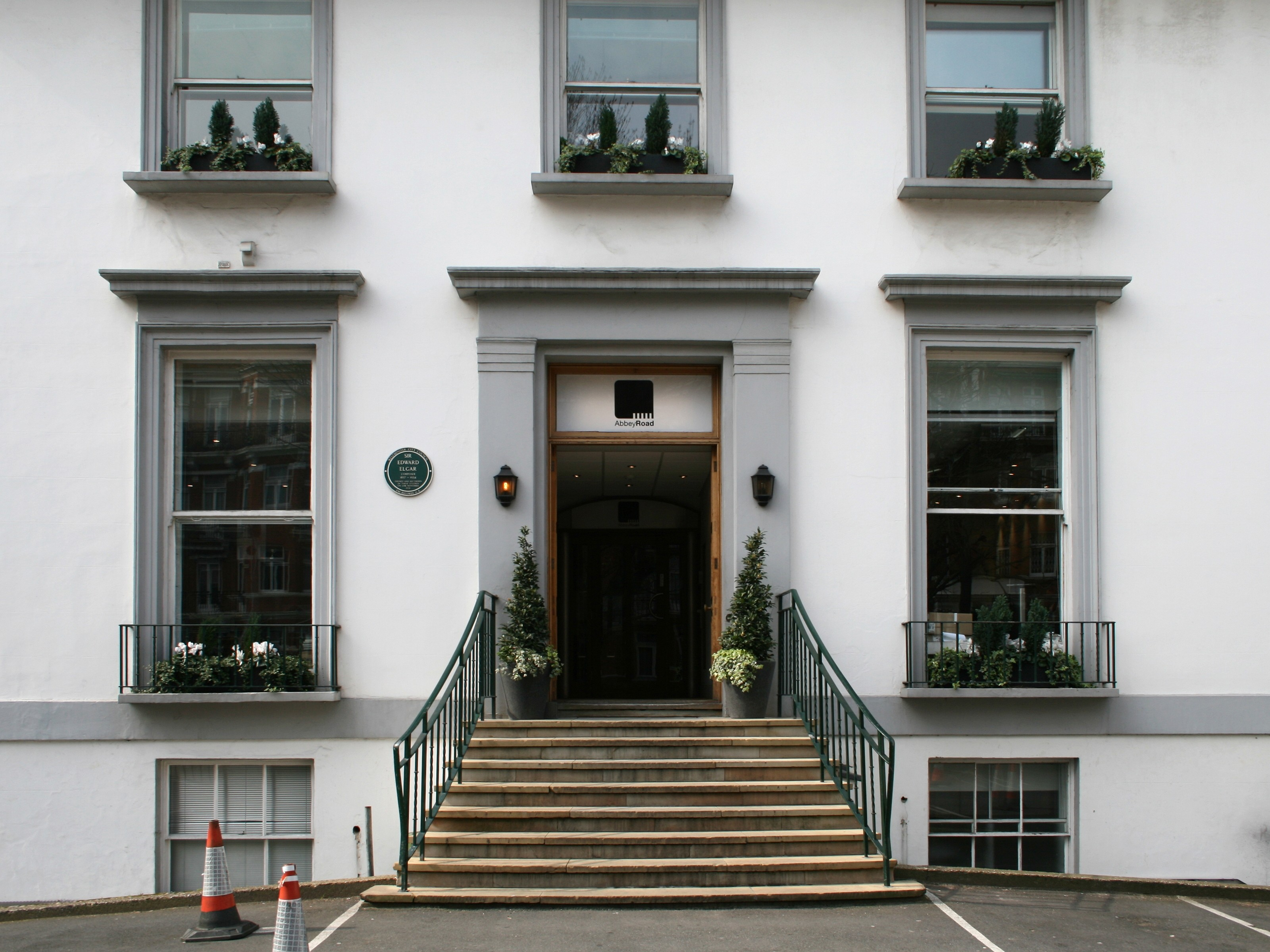
Abbey Road Studios, where the strings on the album were recorded.

The tracks on Coming Up to Breathe were recorded in Allaire Studios in Shokan, New York; the studio had previously hosted artists such as Norah Jones, Tim McGraw, and David Bowie. Overdubs were recorded at Oxford Sound in Nashville, Tennessee. Strings were recorded at Abbey Road Studios in London, England by the London Session Orchestra. Recording sessions at Allaire started in October 2005, and lasted a month.

== Composition ==
Although Coming Up to Breathe possesses an overall heavier tone than MercyMe's previous albums, it has been described as an extension or a shift in presentation rather than a total departure. The sound of the album has been described as epitomizing the genre of modern rock. Guitars and guitar solos are more prominent on the album.

As a whole, the album does not mention Jesus directly by name; the only song to do so, "Bring the Rain" uses his name in the refrain "Jesus, bring the rain". "I Would Die for You" is also a tribute to a teen who died after serving on a mission field. "One Trick Pony" is a response to MercyMe's critics who argue that the band recycles the same song over and over. "So Long Self" is about bidding farewell to sinful nature, while "Hold Fast" is a reminder of God's presence through difficult times. "Something About You" and "3:42 a.m. (Writer's Block)" both relate to the difficulty of writing a song about an omnipotent God.

== Critical reception ==
Professional ratings
Review scores
Source	Rating
Allmusic	4/5 stars
Billboard	(positive)
CCM Magazine	B−
Cross Rhythms	9/10 squares
Christianity Today	3.5/5 stars
Jesus Freak Hideout	4/5 stars
USA Today	2.5/4 stars

Coming Up to Breathe received positive reception from music critics. Steve Losey of Allmusic gave the album four out of five stars, saying, "In a concerted effort to revert back to the days when they were more a rock band and less of a hitmaking machine, MercyMe delivers. While it's certainly not heavy metal, the songs definitely keep driving forward. Guitars are more prominent and production leans on a more earthy formula... MercyMe is able to rock on portions of each song but they always bring it back to a memorable chorus or a hooky verse. That's the formula that has always worked for them, and it does here, too." Deborah Evans Price of Billboard noted, "For the most part, MercyMe has built a multi-platinum foundation on compelling power ballads. But on this set, the Texas band rocks out with passion and edgy intensity. It doesn't stray so far that it would alienate the faithful, but it delivers a powerful collection of pop/rock that should take the band's career to a new level." She also praised Millard's vocals and called it a "landmark album in an already impressive career". Mark Joseph of CCM Magazine gave the album a B−; he called the album "enjoyable" but suggesting that a stronger producer or A&R team would have resulted in better lyrics. Tony Cummings of Cross Rhythms gave the album nine out of ten stars, praising the vocals and string arrangements as well as the choir on "Bring the Rain". Russ Breimeier of The Fish called Coming Up to Breathe MercyMe's "best album to date" and an "impressive step in the right direction for a band that many have pegged to be too formulaic", but derided the album's "simplistic songwriting".

Lauren Summerford of Jesus Freak Hideout gave the album four out of five stars, calling it "unlike anything we've heard from [MercyMe] so far" and "undeniably strong project from MercyMe". She suggested that some of the lyrics off the album are too predictable, but said that "some places [on the album] display some of the best songwriting we have heard from the band so far". Brian Mansfield of USA Today gave the album two-and-a-half out of four stars, opining that it "has the feel of a blockbuster rock album" but suggesting that the Christian songwriting on the record would limit its success.

Coming Up to Breathe was nominated for Best Pop/Contemporary Gospel Album at the 49th Grammy Awards. It was also nominated for Pop/Contemporary Album of the Year at the 38th GMA Dove Awards. "Bring the Rain" was nominated for Dove Award for Song of the Year at the 39th GMA Dove Awards.

== Singles ==
Three singles were released in promotion of Coming Up to Breathe. "So Long Self" was released on March 18, 2006 as the lead single from the album. It was added by fifty-two Christian AC stations in its first week, a record for the most first-week adds in the history of Christian AC radio. It peaked at number one on the Billboard Hot Christian Songs chart, spending a total of four weeks at the top of that chart. It also appeared on the Billboard Adult Contemporary chart, peaking at number sixteen. "So Long Self" ranked at number ten on the 2006 year-end Hot Christian Songs chart.

The second single from Coming Up to Breathe, "Hold Fast" was released on September 4, 2006. It peaked at number three on the Hot Christian Songs chart and at number twenty-seven on the Adult Contemporary chart.

The final single from the album, "Bring the Rain", was released on March 24, 2007. It peaked at number one on the Hot Christian Songs chart. It ranked at number five on the 2007 year-end Hot Christian Songs chart and at number forty-nine on the decade-end Hot Christian Songs chart. An album cut, "No More No Less", spent one frame on the Hot Christian Songs chart, debuting and peaking at number thirty.

== Release ==
Coming Up to Breathe was released on April 25, 2006. Coming Up to Breathe sold 58,000 copies in its first week, debuting atop the Christian Albums chart and at number 13 on the Billboard 200. The album beat out MercyMe's previous best sales week (56,000 copies), which came following the release of their 2004 album "Undone". "Coming Up to Breathe" also peaked at number 5 on the Rock Albums chart and number 13 on the Alternative Albums chart during its chart run. Coming Up to Breathe ranked at number 6 on 2006 year-end Christian Albums chart, and at number 14 on the 2007 year-end Christian Albums chart. In 2007, the album was certified Gold by the Recording Industry Association of America, signifying shipments of 500,000 copies.

An acoustic version of the album, Coming Up to Breathe: Acoustic, was released in late 2007 and peaked at number 22 on the Christian Albums chart.

== Track listing ==
All tracks are written by MercyMe

No.	Title	Length
1.	"Coming Up to Breathe"	4:18
2.	"So Long Self"	4:03
3.	"Hold Fast"	4:38
4.	"Something About You"	4:55
5.	"You're To Blame"	4:14
6.	"No More No Less"	5:46
7.	"Where I Belong"	4:39
8.	"Bring the Rain"	5:30
9.	"Last One Standing"	3:39
10.	"One Trick Pony"	3:26
11.	"3:42 A.M. (Writer's Block)"	3:35
12.	"Safe and Sound"	3:43
13.	"I Would Die For You" (hidden track "Have Fun In Life" appears at the end of the album)	12:49
Total length:		65:15

== Personnel ==
Credits adapted from the album liner notes

MercyMe

- Bart Millard – lead vocals, backing vocals
- Jim Bryson – keys
- Mike Scheuchzer – guitar, backing vocals
- Barry Graul – guitar, backing vocals
- Nathan Cochran – bass, backing vocals
- Robby Shaffer – drums

Additional performers

- Blair Masters – programming, additional keyboards
- Eric Darken – percussion
- Sam Levine – clarinet
- Barry Green – trombone
- Mike Haynes – trumpet
- Joe Murphy – tuba
- Carl Marsh – string arrangements and conductor
- Gavyn Wright – concertmaster
- The London Session Orchestra – strings
- Travis Cottrell – additional backing vocals (2)
- Gene Miller – additional backing vocals (2)
- Aaron Sternke – additional backing vocals (5)

Choir on "Bring the Rain"

- Lisa Bevill
- Da'dra Crawford Greathouse
- Steve Crawford
- Mandisa Hundley
- Michael Mellett
- Fiona Mellett
- Abel Orta
- Jovaun Woods
Production and design
- Brown Bannister – producer
- Steve Bishir – recording, string recording, mixing (9, 10)
- Aaron Sternke – additional engineer, digital editing
- Billy Whittington – additional engineer, digital editing
- Matthew Cullen – recording assistant
- Andrew Dudman – string recording assistant
- Bob Clearmountain – mixing (1–8, 11–13)
- Brandon Duncan – mix assistant (1–8, 11–13)
- Stephen Marcussen – mastering
- Traci Bishir – production assistant
- Mike Casteel – music preparation
- Eberhead Ramm – music preparation
- Tony Stanton – music preparation
- Shatrine Krake – art direction, design
- Bob Hedlund – additional design
- Kenny Comerford – photography
- Philippe Lardy – original paintings
- Overdubbed at Oxford Sound (Nashville, Tennessee)
- Tracks 1–8 & 11–13 mixed at Mix This! (Pacific Palisades, California).
- Tracks 9 & 10 mixed at Oxford Sound.
- Mastered at Marcussen Mastering (Hollywood, California).

== Charts and certifications ==
Weekly album charts
Chart (2006)	Peak position
US Billboard 200	13
US Christian Albums (Billboard)	1
US Rock Albums (Billboard)	5
Chart (2007)	Peak position
US Alternative Albums (Billboard)	13

Weekly single charts
Year	Song	Peak chart positions	
Year	Song	US Christ	US AC
2006	"So Long Self"	1	16
2006	"Homesick"	3	27
2007	"Bring the Rain"	1	—

Year-end charts
Chart (2006)	Peak position
US Christian Albums (Billboard)	9
Chart (2007)	Peak position
US Christian Albums (Billboard)	14

Certifications
Country	Certification	Units shipped
United States	Gold	500,000
