= So Long Self =

2006 single by MercyMe

Single by MercyMe

from the album Coming Up to Breathe
- Released: March 2006
- Recorded: 2005 in the United States and England: Allaire Studios (Shokan, NY); Oxford Sound (Nashville, TN); Abbey Road Studios (London, England)
- Length: 4:03
- Label: INO
- Songwriters: James Bryson, Nathan Cochran, Barry Graul, Bart Millard, Michael John Scheuchzer, Robin Shaffer
- Producer: Brown Bannister

MercyMe singles chronology
"In the Blink of an Eye" (2005)	"So Long Self" (2006)	"Hold Fast" (2006)

"So Long Self" is a song written and performed by Christian rock band MercyMe. "So Long Self" is musically a song with a lyrical theme revolving around a figurative breakup with one's self. "So Long Self" was released as the lead single from the band's 2006 album Coming Up to Breathe.

"So Long Self" received positive reception from critics, who praised the song's lyrical hook. It was added by fifty-two Christian AC stations in its first chart week, a record for the Christian AC chart. The song had success on both Christian and mainstream radio, peaking at number one on the Christian Songs chart for four consecutive weeks; it also peaked at number sixteen on the Adult Contemporary chart. It was listed on Billboard magazine's 2006 year-end Christian Songs and Adult Contemporary charts.

== Background and composition ==
So Long Self
An audio sample of the first chorus from "So Long Self".

Lead singer Bart Millard has described the story behind "So Long Self" as "...really simple: It’s Not About [humanity]. It never has been and it never will be. Just like when maybe you had to break up with a girlfriend or a boyfriend growing up, or maybe the same thing happened to you, the ultimate breakup in life is when we breakup with ourselves. Because Christ said you have to die to self to follow him". The song is also lyrically about a break-up with sinful human nature.

"So Long Self" was written and composed by MercyMe. It was recorded in Allaire Studios in Shokan, New York; overdubs were recorded in Oxford Sound in Nashville, Tennessee, while strings were recorded at Abbey Road Studios in London, England. "So Long Self" is a song with a length of four minutes and three seconds. The song is set in the key of A-flat major and has a tempo of 144 beats per minute, with a vocal range spanning from B_{3} to E_{5}. "So Long Self" features a guitar solo near the end of the song, and the bridge of the song features what has been described as Electric Light Orchestra-influenced vocals.

== Reception ==
=== Critical reception ===
"So Long Self" received positive reviews from critics. Steve Losey of Allmusic commented that "['So Long Self'] has mass appeal musically and lyrically", also opining that "the coolest part about the poppy hook is the ELO type vocals that penetrate the song's middle". Lauren Summerford of Jesus Freak Hideout stated that "Lead single 'So Long Self' is one of the best tracks Coming Up To Breathe has to offer. With a lyrical hook sure to have radio listeners singing along, this song finds [Bart] Millard bidding farewell to sinful nature and moving closer to Christ". Russ Breimeier of Christianity Today commented that "It almost seems like MercyMe is overcompensating to gain artistic credibility with the bouncy single 'So Long Self,' an undeniably catchy breakup song with our sinful nature that echoes [Steven Curtis] Chapman covering The Beatles, going so far as to playfully evoke a carnival in the bridge".

=== Chart performance ===
Upon release, the song was added by fifty-two Christian AC stations - a record for the most adds in the history of the Christian AC chart. The record was previously forty-five adds, accomplished by the Joy Williams song "Hide" (2005). "So Long Self" later peaked at number one on the Christian AC chart, as well as at number one on the Christian Songs chart and at number sixteen on the Adult Contemporary chart.

"So Long Self" debuted at No. 26 on Billboard magazine's Christian Songs chart for the chart week of April 1, 2006. The song jumped up to No. 15 the next week before advancing to No. 10 in its fourth chart week. "So Long Self" advanced to No. 4 for the chart week of May 13, 2006, and hit No. 1 ten weeks later, a spot the song held for four consecutive weeks. After "So Long Self" spent its fourth and final weeks at the top, the song spent nine more weeks on the chart before dropping out. In all, "So Long Self" spent twenty-six weeks on the chart. On the Billboard Adult Contemporary chart, "So Long Self" debuted at No. 38 for the chart week of May 6, 2006, and advanced to No. 23 in its second week on the chart. The song advanced to No. 20 in its fourth week on the chart and spent a further three weeks inside the top 20 before dropping back to No. 22 on its eighth chart week. "So Long Self" reached its eventual peak of No. 16 for the chart week of August 5, 2006, and spent a further six weeks on the chart before dropping out. In all, "So Long Self" spent twenty weeks on the chart.

Billboard ranked "So Long Self" at No. 10 on its 2006 year-end Christian Songs chart, and at No. 33 on its year-end Adult Contemporary chart. They also ranked the song at No. 61 on the 2000s decade-end Hot Christian AC chart.

== Music video ==
MercyMe in the music video for "So Long Self"

A music video was released for "So Long Self". The video opens with the members of the band watching a television program of their live soundcheck for a concert. When the band realizes it cannot possibly be playing a 'live' soundcheck since they are in their tour bus, they exit the vehicle to stop the imposters. The real band members trap the fakes in a room, and then go out on stage and perform. Near the end of the video, security kicks the fake band members out of the arena.

Matt Johnson of Jesus Freak Hideout commented about the video on his review of MercyMe's album 10, noting that "Most people think of serious worshipful songs (such as "I Can Only Imagine" & "Word of God Speak") when they think of MercyMe, but the "So Long Self" video captures a side that most don't think of, their fun side".

== Charts ==
=== Weekly charts ===
Chart (2006)	Peak Position
Radio & Records Christian AC	1
Billboard Hot Christian Songs	1
Billboard Adult Contemporary	16

=== Year-end charts ===
Chart (2006)	Position
Billboard Christian Songs	10
Billboard Christian Adult Contemporary	10
Billboard Adult Contemporary	33

=== Decade-end charts ===
Chart (2000s)	Position
Billboard Hot Christian AC	61

== See also ==
- List of number-one Billboard Christian Songs of the 2000s
