= Beautiful One =

Single by By the Tree

from the album Hold You High
- Released: 2004
- Genre: Christian rock; pop rock
- Length: 4:12
- Label: Word
- Songwriter: Tim Hughes

"Beautiful One" is a song written by Tim Hughes. "Beautiful One" was originally recorded by Jeremy Camp for his 2004 album Carried Me. That same year, By the Tree covered "Beautiful One" on Hold You High, and it was released as a single.

== Charts ==
Weekly

Chart (2004)	Peak Position
U.S. Billboard Christian Songs	1

Decade-end

Chart (2000s)	Position
Billboard Hot Christian Songs	36
