= Joseph's Lullaby =

Single by MercyMe

from the album The Christmas Sessions
- Released: 2005
- Genre: Christmas
- Length: 3:44
- Label: INO Records
- Songwriter(s): Brown Bannister, Bart Millard
- Producer(s): Brown Bannister

Joseph's Lullaby is a song written and recorded by Christian rock band MercyMe. It was released as a single from the band's 2005 album The Christmas Sessions.

== Charts ==
Chart (2006)	Peak Position
U.S. Billboard Christian Songs	1
