= Finally Home =

Single by MercyMe

from the album All That Is Within Me
- Released: December 26, 2008
- Recorded: 2007, Cider Mountain Studio (Athol, Idaho)
- Genre: Contemporary Christian music
- Length: 3:30
- Label: INO
- Songwriters: Millard, Graul, Scheuchzer
- Producer: Brown Bannister

MercyMe singles chronology
| "You Reign" (2008) | "Finally Home" (2008) | "All of Creation" (2010) |

"Finally Home" is a song by contemporary Christian music band MercyMe. Co-written by Bart Millard, Barry Graul, and Mike Scheuchzer, the song has lyrical themes revolving around heaven, with the music written around an acoustic guitar riff. It also contains musical influences from country and pop music, and features harmony vocals from Millard.

"Finally Home" was released as the third single from MercyMe's 2007 album All That Is Within Me and peaked at No. 1 on Billboard magazine's Soft AC/INSPO and Christian AC charts, No. 3 on the Hot Christian Songs chart, and No. 16 on the Hot Adult Contemporary Tracks chart. The song ranked at No. 9 on Billboard's 2009 year-end Hot Christian AC chart, and No. 12 on the year-end Hot Christian Songs chart.

== Background ==
"Finally Home" was written after lead singer Bart Millard heard guitarists Mike Scheuchzer and Barry Graul improvising with an acoustic guitar riff. According to Millard, he "wrote the first line and just started bawling. Then we played it for our producer, and he started bawling". Millard was not sure the song would fit on the record, but Brown Bannister (the group's producer) told him "You just made a grown man cry. It's going on the record".

== Composition ==
"Finally Home" is a Contemporary Christian song with influences from country and pop, and has a length of three minutes and 30 seconds.

The song is set in the key of E major and has a moderate tempo of 64 beats per minute, and with a vocal range spanning from B_{3}–A_{5}. "Finally Home" is similar to MercyMe's previous songs "I Can Only Imagine" and "Homesick" in theme, with the lyrics revolving around heaven. The instrumentation of the song is based around an acoustic guitar riff, and features harmony vocals from lead singer Bart Millard.

== Reception ==
=== Critical reception ===
"Finally Home" received generally positive to mixed critical reception. Jared Johnson of Allmusic opined in his review of All That Is Within Me that "The album's crowning moment is "Finally Home," a mesmerizing acoustic journey that takes listeners to a place where they are reunited with loved ones". Russ Breimeier of The Fish commented that "With "Finally Home," we get another heaven song from the same guys responsible for "I Can Only Imagine," "Homesick," and others. The flowing acoustic pop style sets it apart from others, but seriously, can we expect a heaven medley from MercyMe in concert someday?"

Chuck Taylor of Billboard commented that "Finally Home"... is a midtempo guitar-driven ode to meeting the maker. Christian AC has already offered its approval and though thematically it's genre-specific, lead singer Bart Millard's beautiful harmonies accompanying a singalong chorus and country radio's wholesome persona open the doors to acceptance there. Overall, a fine contender to further this established band's brand". Lauren Summerford of Jesus Freak Hideout was more apathetic about the song, commenting that "The acoustic guitar based "Finally Home" fills the void of the "ballad about getting to heaven" spot we've come to expect from MercyMe".

=== Chart performance ===
"Finally Home" debuted at No. 21 on the Hot Christian Songs chart for the chart week of January 17, 2009. The song moved to No. 19 in its second chart week, and to No. 16 in its third week. "Finally Home" jumped to No. 8 in its sixth chart week, and advanced to No. 5 in its thirteenth chart week, a spot it held for two weeks. After advancing and spending a further three weeks at No. 4, "Finally Home" reached its peak of No. 3 for the chart week of May 16, 2009, a position it held for two weeks. The song spent a further eight weeks on the chart before dropping out after the chart week of July 18, 2009. "Finally Home" also peaked at No. 1 on the Christian AC and Soft AC/INSPO charts.

On the Adult Contemporary chart, "Finally Home" debuted at No. 27 for the chart week of April 4, 2009, a spot it held for two weeks. The song advanced to No. 27 in its third chart week, and reached its peak position of No. 16 on its tenth chart week. The song spent ten more weeks on the chart before dropping out, spending twenty weeks on the chart in total.

== Music video ==
A music video was released for "Finally Home". The video features the band performing the song live, with heavy uses of special effects in between and during shots.

== Charts ==
=== Weekly charts ===
| Chart (2009) | Peak Position |
|---|---|
| U.S. Billboard Christian AC | 1 |
| U.S. Billboard Soft AC/INSPO | 1 |
| U.S. Billboard Hot Christian Songs | 3 |
| U.S. Billboard Hot Adult Contemporary Tracks | 16 |

=== Year-end charts ===
| Chart (2009) | Position |
|---|---|
| U.S. Billboard Hot Christian AC | 9 |
| U.S. Billboard Hot Christian Songs | 12 |

=== Decade-end charts ===
| Chart (2000s) | Position |
|---|---|
| U.S. Billboard Hot Christian AC | 72 |
