= The Baylor Lariat =

Baylor University student newspaper

- Type: Student newspaper
- School: Baylor University
- Publisher: Baylor University
- Editor: Kalena Reynolds (2026)
- Founded: 1900
- Headquarters: Waco, Texas, U.S.
- Website: baylorlariat.com

The Baylor Lariat is the student newspaper of Baylor University in Waco, Texas.

== History ==
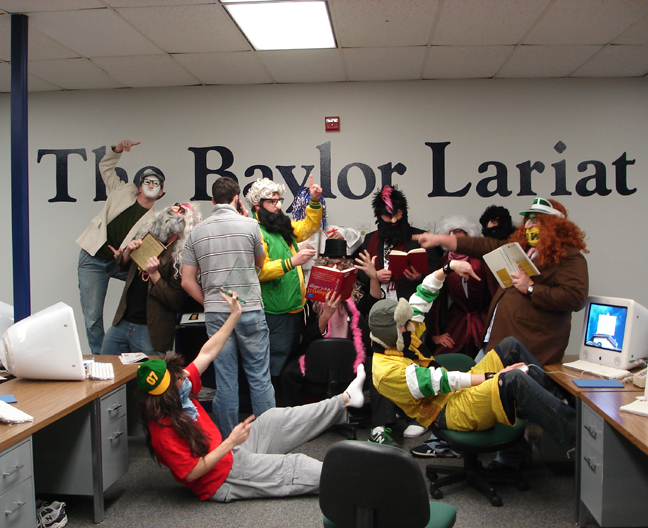
The Baylor Lariat staff dressed in costumes

The Baylor Lariat was officially begun in 1900 as The Varsity Lariat; it was formed out of a realization that "a high grade weekly was desired" to keep students, faculty, and alumni aware of campus events and news (including news from nearby colleges). The Lariat replaced The Baylor Weekly Leaf, whose editor was credited in the Lariat's first issue with "taking the initiative" of reporting Baylor news.

== Gay marriage controversy ==
On February 27, 2004, The Baylor Lariat published an editorial in support of San Francisco's offering of marriage licenses to gay couples. The piece, which was supported by five of the editorial board's seven members, elicited a response from Robert B. Sloan Jr., who served as Baylor University president at the time. In a written statement, he claimed that he and many of the students, alumni, and parents were "justifiably outraged".

== See also ==
- List of student newspapers in the United States of America
