= Does Anybody Hear Her =

Single by Casting Crowns

from the album Lifesong
- Released: September 23, 2006
- Recorded: Zoo Studio (Franklin, TN); Lifesong Studio (McDonough, GA); Little Big Studio (Nashville, TN)
- Genre: Christian rock, adult contemporary
- Length: 4:28
- Label: Beach Street, Reunion, PLG
- Songwriter: Mark Hall
- Producer: Mark A. Miller

Casting Crowns singles chronology
"Praise You In This Storm" (2006)	"Does Anybody Hear Her" (2006)	"East to West" (2007)

"Does Anybody Hear Her" is a song recorded by Christian rock band Casting Crowns, released by Beach Street Records, Reunion Records, and Provident Label Group. Written by Mark Hall and produced by Mark A. Miller, it was released on September 23, 2006, as the third single from the band's 2005 album Lifesong. An alternative CCM and adult contemporary song, "Does Anybody Hear Her" relates the story of a girl who is being pushed away by the Christian church as well as the message that condemning other people is wrong.

"Does Anybody Hear Her" received positive reviews from most music critics, many of whom praised the song's lyrical theme. It was successful on Christian radio, peaking at number one on the Billboard Hot Christian Songs and Hot Christian AC charts; it also topped the Radio & Records Christian AC and Soft AC/Inspirational charts. It ranked at number 33 on the 2000s decade-end Hot Christian AC chart and number 46 on the 2000s decade-end Hot Christian Songs chart.

== Background and production ==
According to lead vocalist Mark Hall, "Does Anybody Hear Her" is about a girl "who is making all the wrong decisions and about how" and how the Christian church is not there for her. Hall began writing the song around 2000 about a girl in his youth group; it ultimately encompassed around 15-20 girls who due to their father not being there for them tried to find intimacy elsewhere, ultimate "[giving] themselves away to the first person who loves them". Hall said that "We [the Christian church] attach identities to people, saying, 'It’s too late to reach this person,' or 'This person here, there’s still some good there, so we should try on this one,' or 'This one’s a lost cause, we just need to get him out of here'. That’s a scary place to live if you’re that person — if you didn’t make the church’s 'list'".

"Does Anybody Hear Her" was written by Mark Hall. It was produced by Mark A. Miller and recorded and mixed by Sam Hewitt at Zoo Studio in Franklin, Tennessee. Additional recording was done at Lifesong Studio in McDonough, Georgia. The song was mastered by Richard Dodd and engineered by Dale Oliver and John Lewis Lee III. The strings on the song were arranged by Bobby Huff and were recorded at Little Big Studio by Boeho Shin and Daewoo Kim.

== Composition ==
"Does Anybody Hear Her"
A 26-second audio sample of parts of the second chorus and bridge of the song.

"Does Anybody Hear Her" is a song with a length of four minutes and 28 seconds. According to the sheet music published by Musicnotes.com, it is set in common time in the key of F major (although the band usually performs the song live in the key of E major) and has a tempo of 77 beats per minute. Mark Hall's vocal range in the song spans from the low note of C_{4} to the high note of F_{5}. A ballad, "Does Anybody Hear Her" is an alternative CCM and adult contemporary song. Lyrically, the song relates the story of a young woman who is being pushed away by the Christian church. It delivers the message that condemning other people is wrong and that the Christian church is being too judgmental of pregnant teenagers.

== Critical reception ==
"Does Anybody Hear Her" received positive reviews from most music critics. Kim Jones of About.com called the song her favorite off of Lifesong. Jared Johnson of Allmusic praised the song as an example of "Mark Hall's artistic balladry". Deborah Evans Price of Billboard described it as "potent". David McCreary of CCM Magazine felt that the song's "softer cadence" didn't diminish its "hard-hitting message". Although describing it as "poignant", Russ Breimeier of Christianity Today felt the song was too broad in scope. John DiBiase of Jesus Freak Hideout described "Does Anybody Hear Her" as "a step backwards from the opening tracks [of Lifesong]" but felt that its musical tone "still works in the grand scheme of the song's message".

== Release and chart performance ==
"Does Anybody Hear Her" was released to Christian AC and Soft AC/Inspirational radio on September 23, 2006. It debuted at number twenty-four on the Billboard Hot Christian Songs for the chart week of November 4, 2006. It advanced to number five in its seventh chart week and to number four in its 12th chart week. In its 15th chart week, "Does Anybody Hear Her" hit the number one position, which it held for six consecutive weeks. In total, it spent 33 weeks on the Hot Christian Songs chart. It also peaked at number one on the Billboard Hot Christian AC and Radio & Records Christian AC and Soft AC/Inspirational charts.

"Does Anybody Hear Her" ranked at number 89 on the 2006 year-end Radio & Records Christian AC chart. It ranked at number eight on the 2007 year-end Billboard Hot Christian AC chart and at number 10 on the 2007 year-end Hot Christian Songs chart, as well as at number eight on the 2007 year-end Radio & Records Christian AC chart and number 13 on the 2007 year-end Soft AC/Inspirational chart. On the decade-end Billboard charts, "Does Anybody Hear Her" ranked at number 33 on the Hot Christian AC chart and number 46 on the Hot Christian Songs chart.

== Live performances ==
Casting Crowns performed "Does Anybody Hear Her" as the fourth song on their set list at a concert on November 12, 2005, at the Stabler Arena in Bethlehem, Pennsylvania. They performed it as the eleventh song on their setlist at a concert on February 4, 2010, at the Sprint Center in Kansas City, Missouri. As part of an acoustic set at a concert on February 28, 2010, in Hershey, Pennsylvania.

== Track listing ==
Digital download

1. "Does Anybody Hear Her" – 4:28

== Credits and personnel ==
Credits adapted from the album liner notes of Lifesong.

Casting Crowns

- Hector Cervantes – Electric guitar
- Juan DeVevo – Electric guitar, acoustic guitar
- Melodee DeVevo – Violin
- Hector Cervantes – Piano, keyboard
- Mark Hall – Vocals
- Chris Huffman – Bass guitar
- Andy Williams – Drums

Additional musicians

- David Angell - Violin
- Monisa Angell - Violin
- David Davidson - Contractor, concertmaster
- Jack Jezioro - Bass
- Anthony Lamarchina - Cello
- Sarighani Reist - Cello
- Pamela Sixfin - Violin
- Mary Vanosdale - Violin
- Kristin Wilkinson - Viola

Technical

- Richard Dodd - Mastering
- Terry Hemmings - Executive producer
- Sam Hewitt - Recording, mixing
- Bobby Huff - String arrangement
- Daewoo Kim - Recording (strings)
- John Lewis Lee III - Engineering
- Jason McArthur - A&R Coordination
- Dale Oliver - Engineering
- Mark A. Miller - Producer
- Boeho "Bobby" Shin - Recording (strings)

== Charts ==
Weekly
Chart (2007)	Peak position
Billboard Hot Christian AC	1
Billboard Hot Christian Songs	1
Radio & Records Christian AC	1
Radio & Records Soft AC/Inspirational	1

Year-end
Chart (2006)	Position
Radio & Records Christian AC	89
Chart (2007)	Position
Billboard Hot Christian AC	8
Billboard Hot Christian Songs	10
Radio & Records Christian AC	8
Radio & Records Soft AC/Inspirational	13

Decade-end
Chart (2000s)	Position
Billboard Hot Christian AC	33
Billboard Hot Christian Songs	46

== Release and radio history ==
Date	Format	Label
September 23, 2006	Christian AC radio	Beach Street, Reunion, PLG
September 23, 2006	Soft AC/Inspirational radio	Beach Street, Reunion, PLG
