= You Reign =

Single by MercyMe

from the album All That Is Within Me
- Released: May 13, 2008
- Recorded: 2007 in the United States (Note: According to the inner liner notes of the album.): Cider Mountain Studio (Athol, Idaho)
- Genre: Christian rock, worship
- Length: 3:50
- Label: INO
- Songwriter(s): Bart Millard, Barry Graul Steven Curtis Chapman
- Producer(s): Brown Bannister

MercyMe singles chronology
| "God with Us" (2007) | "You Reign" (2008) | "Finally Home" (2009) |

"You Reign" is a song written and performed by Christian rock band MercyMe. The song was co-written by Bart Millard, Barry Graul, and Steven Curtis Chapman, and was released as the second single from their fifth studio album, All That Is Within Me.

The song peaked at No. 2 on the Hot Christian Songs chart and No. 1 on the Christian AC Monitored and Soft AC/Inspo chart. It ranked No. 5 on the 2008 year-end Hot Christian AC chart, and No. 6 on the year-end Hot Christian Songs chart, and was nominated for "Song of the Year" at the 40th GMA Dove Awards and for "Best Gospel Song" at the 51st Grammy Awards.

== Background and composition ==
"You Reign" was written following an iChat conversation between lead singer Bart Millard and Steven Curtis Chapman. The band was rushing to get new material for their album All That Is Within Me, and Chapman shared a song idea he had been unable to finish. MercyMe developed the song from there, and decided to release it as their second single from the album.

"You Reign" is a worship song with a length of three minutes and 50 seconds. The song is set in the key of C major and has a tempo of 80 beats per minute, with a vocal range spanning from B♭_{3}-G_{5}

== Reception ==
=== Critical reception ===
Critical reception to "You Reign" was generally mixed. Jay Heilman of Christian Music Review gave the song a positive review, commenting that the song "is another worship song that testifies to the fact that Jesus, who through the Lord, [sic] reigns over all creation. The chorus is a great proclamation... These are the kind of reminders that I like to hear in music". Today's Christian Music called "You Reign" "a tune destined to be covered by youth worship bands all across the country". Russ Breimeier of Christianity Today, however, criticized the song, commenting that the song's chorus is "the chorus to probably at least 100 worship songs, right?"

=== Chart performance ===
"You Reign" debuted at No. 23 on the Billboard Hot Christian Songs chart for the chart week of June 21, 2008. The song advanced to No. 17 in its second week and to No. 12 in its third week. The song jumped to No. 10 in its fourth week, and to No. 4 in its fifth week. "You Reign" reached its peak of No. 2 for the chart week of July 26, 2008, its sixth week on the chart. It held that spot for 15 consecutive weeks, blocked by Third Day's "Call My Name" and Brandon Heath's Give Me Your Eyes. The song dropped to No. 4 in its 21st chart week and spent a further 15 weeks on the chart before dropping out. In all, "You Reign" spent a total of thirty-six weeks on the Christian Songs chart.

"You Reign" also peaked at No. 1 on the Billboard Hot Christian AC chart and No. 1 on the Radio & Records Christian AC Monitored and Soft AC/Inspirational charts.

=== Awards and accolades ===
"You Reign" was nominated for "Song of the Year" at the 40th GMA Dove Awards and "Best Gospel Song" at the 51st Grammy Awards.

== Charts ==
=== Weekly charts ===
| Chart (2008) | Peak Position |
|---|---|
| U.S. Radio & Records Christian AC Monitored | 1 |
| U.S. Radio & Records Soft AC/Inspo | 1 |
| U.S. Billboard Hot Christian AC | 1 |
| U.S. Billboard Christian Songs | 2 |

=== Year-end charts ===
| Chart (2008) | Position |
|---|---|
| Billboard Hot Christian AC | 5 |
| Billboard Hot Christian Songs | 6 |

=== Decade-end charts ===
| Chart (2000s) | Position |
|---|---|
| Billboard Hot Christian Songs | 35 |
| Billboard Hot Christian AC | 49 |
