= By the Tree =

American Christian rock band

- Origin: Weatherford, Texas, U.S.
- Genres: Contemporary Christian music
- Years active: 1997–2007
- Labels: Fervent
- Members: Aaron Blanton; Chuck Dennie; Ben Davis

By the Tree was a contemporary Christian rock group. They were active from 1997 to 2007, releasing two self-produced albums followed by six albums with Fervent Records. Their notable successes included their 2001 album Invade My Soul, which won two Dove Awards, and their number-one hit "Beautiful One".

== Overview ==
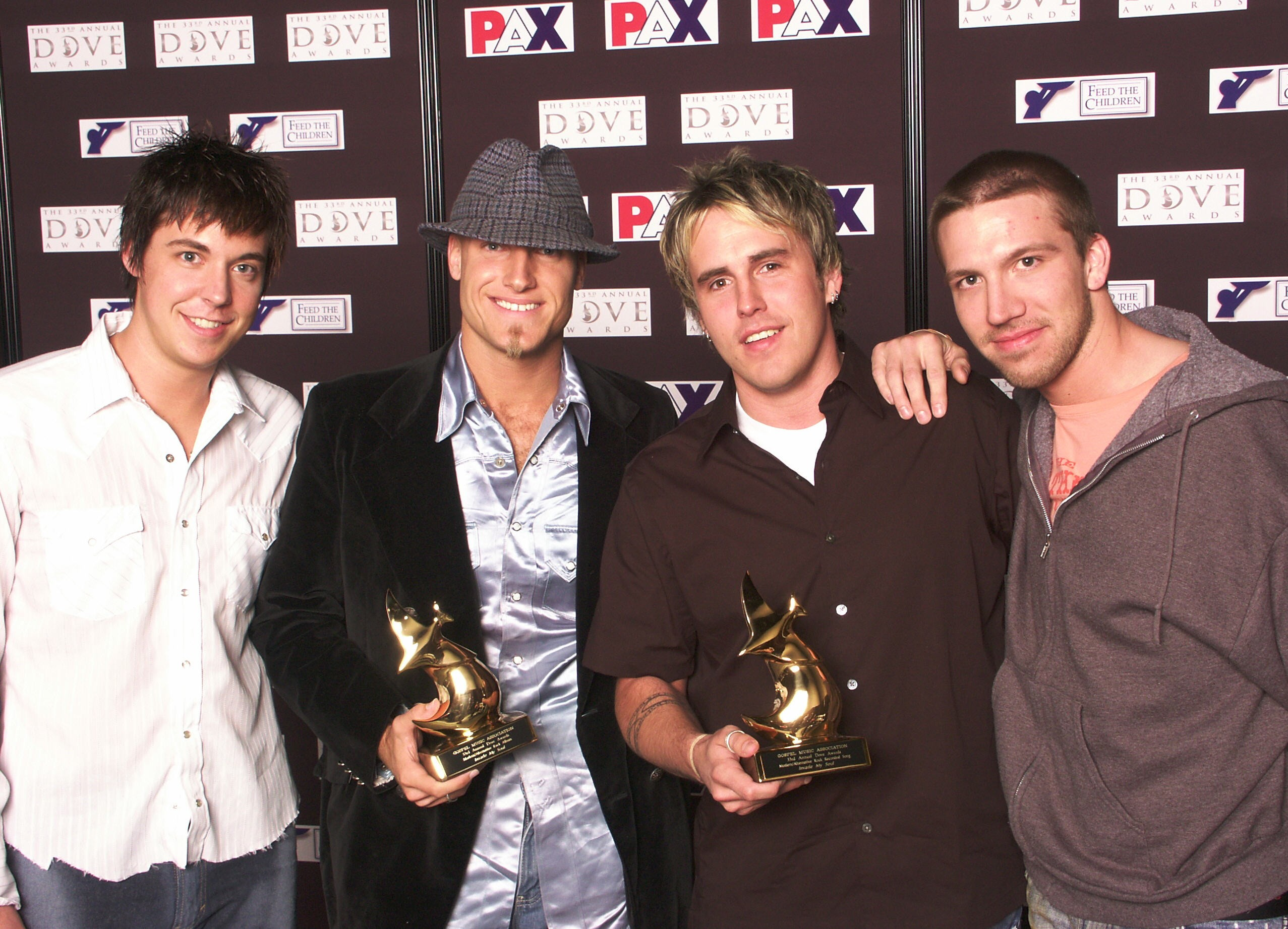
Ben Davis, Kevin Rhoads, Chuck Dennie, and Aaron Blanton, backstage at the 2001 Dove Awards.

By the Tree was founded in Weatherford, Texas in 1997 by Chuck Dennie and Bala Boyd.

By the Tree got their start playing a series of small venues — predominantly churches — throughout the southern and southwestern United States. In 1999 they released two independent, self-produced CDs, which they sold at their concerts. By 2001, these two CDs had sold a combined 30,000 units, which more than recouped their production costs, and additionally brought them to the attention of the Christian music industry.

The band eventually signed with Fervent Records, part of the BMG music publishing company. Their first national U.S. commercial recording was Invade My Soul. The album charted on the Billboard Christian Albums chart and Independent chart. The album eventually went on to win two Dove Awards: The album itself won Best Modern Rock/Alternative Album, and the album's title track won Best Recorded Song.

By the Tree achieved a number-one hit single with a cover of Tim Hughes's song "Beautiful One" in 2004. The song reached the number-one position on the Billboard Hot Christian Songs chart on October 30, 2004, and stayed in the top spot for four weeks. By the Tree released four albums under the Fervent label.

== Members ==
Current

- Chuck Dennie – vocals
- Aaron Blanton – drums
- Ben Davis – bass

Former

- K.S. Rhoads – vocals, guitar
- Samuel McKern – drums
- Charlie Goddard – vocals, guitar
- Garrett Goodwin – drums
- Dustin Sauder – lead guitar, vocals
- David Canington – keyboard, guitar
- John Dennie – guitar
- Ryan Tallent – bass guitar, keyboards, vocals, production/engineering
- Bala Boyd – drums
- Betsy Craig Caswell – vocals
- Melissa Wood Stein – vocals

== Discography ==
- Passion for Jesus (1999) (Self-produced and distributed)
- Shoot Me Down (1999) (Self-produced and distributed)
- Invade My Soul (Fervent Records, 2001) U.S. Christian No. 35
- These Days (Fervent, 2002) U.S. Christian No. 17
- Root (Fervent, 2003) U.S. Christian No. 15
- Hold You High (Fervent, 2004)
- World On Fire (Fervent, 2006)
- Beautiful One: The Best of By the Tree (Fervent, 2007)

=== Singles ===
List of singles, with selected chart positions, showing year released and album name
Year	Title	Peak positions		Album
Year	Title	US Christ.	US Christ. AC	Album
2004	"Beautiful One"	1	1	Hold You High
2005	"Hold You High"	25	24	Hold You High
2005	"Only To You"	—	40	Hold You High
