= Bring the Rain =

Single by MercyMe

from the album Coming Up to Breathe
- Released: March 24, 2007
- Recorded: 2006
- Studio: Allaire Studios (Shokan, NY)
- Genre: Pop rock/CCM
- Length: 5:30 (album version); 4:40 (radio edit)
- Label: INO Records
- Songwriters: James Bryson, Nathan Cochran, Barry Graul, Michael John Scheuchzer, Bart Millard
- Producer: Brown Bannister

MercyMe singles chronology
| "Hold Fast" (2006) | "Bring the Rain" (2007) | "God with Us" (2007) |

"Bring the Rain" is a song by American Christian rock band MercyMe from their 2006 album Coming Up to Breathe. It was released on March 24, 2007, as the third radio single. The song became the band's sixth Hot Christian Songs No. 1, staying there for one week. It lasted 32 weeks on the overall chart. The song is played in an A major key at 158 beats per minute.

== Background ==
=== Composition ===
"Bring The Rain" is a five minute and thirty second track. The song is the only track on the album to directly say the name Jesus. It uses his name in the refrain "Jesus, bring the rain".

=== Critical reception ===
Tony Cummings of Cross Rhythms praised the vocals and string arrangements as well as the choir from "Bring the Rain".

== Track listing ==
CD release

1. "Bring The Rain (Track with Background Vocals)" – 5:30
2. "Bring The Rain (Track with No Background Vocals)" – 5:31
3. "Bring The Rain (Low Key Track with No Background Vocals)" – 5:31
4. "Bring The Rain (High Key Track with No Background Vocals)" – 5:31
5. "Bring The Rain" – 5:30

== Awards ==
In 2008, the song was nominated for a Dove Award for Song of the Year at the 39th GMA Dove Awards.

== Charts ==
=== Weekly charts ===
| Chart (2007) | Peak position |
|---|---|
| US Christian AC (Billboard) | 1 |
| US Hot Christian Songs (Billboard) | 1 |
| US Christian AC Indicator (Billboard) | 1 |
| US Christian Soft AC (Billboard) | 1 |

=== Year-end charts ===
| Chart (2007) | Peak position |
|---|---|
| US Christian Songs (Billboard) | 5 |

=== Decade-end charts ===
| Chart (2000s) | Peak position |
|---|---|
| US Christian Songs (Billboard) | 49 |
