= The London Session Orchestra =

The London Session Orchestra was a film, TV, and pop orchestra based in London. It was founded in 1993 and led by Gavyn Wright and is known for its work on movies such as Run Lola Run (1998) V for Vendetta (2005), and Mission: Impossible – Rogue Nation (2015), as well as famous pop songs like "Angels" by Robbie Williams. The orchestra also collaborated with artist Lionel Richie for recording sessions in 2000 under the one-off alias 'The L.M.O. Studio Orchestra.' It was dissolved in 2017. The last movie soundtracks the orchestra produced were for the movies Overboard and Status Update, both released in 2018.
