= Books of Mortals =

Book by Ted Dekker & Tosca Lee

- Author: Ted Dekker & Tosca Lee
- Language: English
- Genre: Christian fiction
- Publication place: United States
- Media type: Print and eBook

Books of Mortals is a Christian science fiction fantasy series by American writers Ted Dekker and Tosca Lee. The series consists of a short story prequel titled The Keeper, followed by three novels: Forbidden, Mortal, and Sovereign.

== Plot ==
=== The Keeper ===
In a Russian wasteland, two hermits, Pavel and Gustov, have heard a horrible secret. As the two sit by a fire one night, they are visited by Talus, a man with a secret so terrible that he must share it with those who will help him protect the knowledge that will one day save all of humanity.

=== Sovereign ===
A war torn world where the Immortals, the Dark Bloods and the Corpses, to the Sovereigns have fought for the supremacy of Earth, and the Sovereigns are losing numbers. Filled with the blood of Jonathan, Jordin becomes one of the leaders of the Sovereigns. Although Jonathan is gone, his blood still heals and those that are healed become followers. Sovereigns are being hunted by Saric and Feyn, and they have to hide in abandoned mazes in the city. They have developed a virus that will kill their enemies, but Rom is convinced that killing Feyn goes against the teachings of Jonathan. Rom tries to bring Feyn to her senses, but Jordin has her own plan. Jordin promises to bring the heads of Saric and Feyn, and the virus will not be spread immediately. It is a dangerous journey for Jordin and Kaya as they try and take advantage of their enemy in a desperate attempt for survival.
