= The Blood Book =

2011 novel by Ted Dekker

The Blood Book: Tales, Confessions and Rumors of the Worlds
- First edition
- Author: Ted Dekker; Kevin Kaiser; Josh Olds
- Language: English
- Series: The Books of History Chronicles
- Genre: Christian, Fantasy
- Publisher: Creative Trust
- Publication date: 2011
- Publication place: United States
- Media type: Print (Paperback)
- Pages: 248

The Blood Book: Tales, Confessions and Rumors of the Worlds is a novel by New York Times bestselling author Ted Dekker, along with Kevin Kaiser and Josh Olds, with additional assistance from Gregg Hart. It is a part of Dekker's mega-series, The Books of History Chronicles. The book is compiled in-universe by High Priest Ba'al, and takes place in the far future in a world known as "Other Earth".

== Plot summary ==
Ba'al commissions General Mustul and alchemist Grushon to study and document a variety of mythical creatures from their world, including the fearsome Shataiki bats and their interesting counterparts, the Roush. Ba'al compiles their accounts into his journal, known as a blood book. He also includes stolen journal entries from his enemy Thomas Hunter and his master, the Shataiki queen Marsuuv. It contains sketches of various creatures and locations featured in Other Earth.

A certain Blood Book, though not Ba'al's, as there were more than one, also plays a significant role in the plot of Immanuel's Veins, as the main character Toma Nicolescu uses the information contained within to defeat the villainous Vlad van Valerick. It appears that the concept of Ba'al's Blood Book was adapted after the release of Immanuel's Veins, as it contains both new and different content than what was mentioned in Immanuel's Veins, and is missing certain other details. A man whom Toma called Saint Thomas the Beast Hunter is implied to be the one who penned Toma's Blood Book.

Ba'al's Blood Book was also mentioned briefly in Dekker's novel Green, as it was compiled only about a year before Green took place.

== Release ==
The Blood Book was first rumored by Dekker on his old forums sometime in 2008, before the release of Green. There he spoke of a pair of journals, known as the "Blood Books," which would give insight into the minds of two characters from his Circle Series, presumably Thomas Hunter and an enemy. As time went on, the two books merged into a single book. In 2009, Ted released Immanuel's Veins, in which a Blood Book plays a significant role.

On his Facebook page, Ted Dekker posted suggesting that he would not publish The Blood Book, but after much protest from his fans, he consented. In 2011, in an effort to promote his newest thriller novel, The Priest's Graveyard, Ted began a campaign entitled "Share the Love". Participants had to pre-order at least three copies of The Priest's Graveyard and email the receipts to Ted's brand manager Kevin Kaiser in order to receive a prize. The extra copies could then be used as gifts to promote Ted's novels beyond his established clientele.

The first prize bundle, for three novels, included Genesis (a very old, rough draft of Black) and a digital download of The Blood Book. This bundle was limited to the first 250 participants.

The second prize bundle, for four novels, included Genesis, The Blood Book download, and a print copy of The Blood Book. The print copy has slight improvements over the digital copy including better editing and a different font for the entries of Thomas Hunter. This bundle was limited to the first 500 participants.

The third prize bundle, for eight novels, included Genesis, The Blood Book download, The Blood Book print copy, a signed ARC of Dekker's upcoming novel, Forbidden (co-authored by Tosca Lee); and a ticket to one of Ted's annual Gatherings. This bundle was limited to the first 250 participants.

The final prize bundle, for forty novels, included all of the above as well as a ticket to The Ragged Edge, a two-day symposium for aspiring authors to learn more about the process of writing and publishing a novel. This bundle was limited to the first 50 participants.

At this point, Ted has no plans of mass-producing The Blood Book for retail, but has left the possibility open for consideration in the future.
