= John Glover (actor) =

American actor (born 1944)

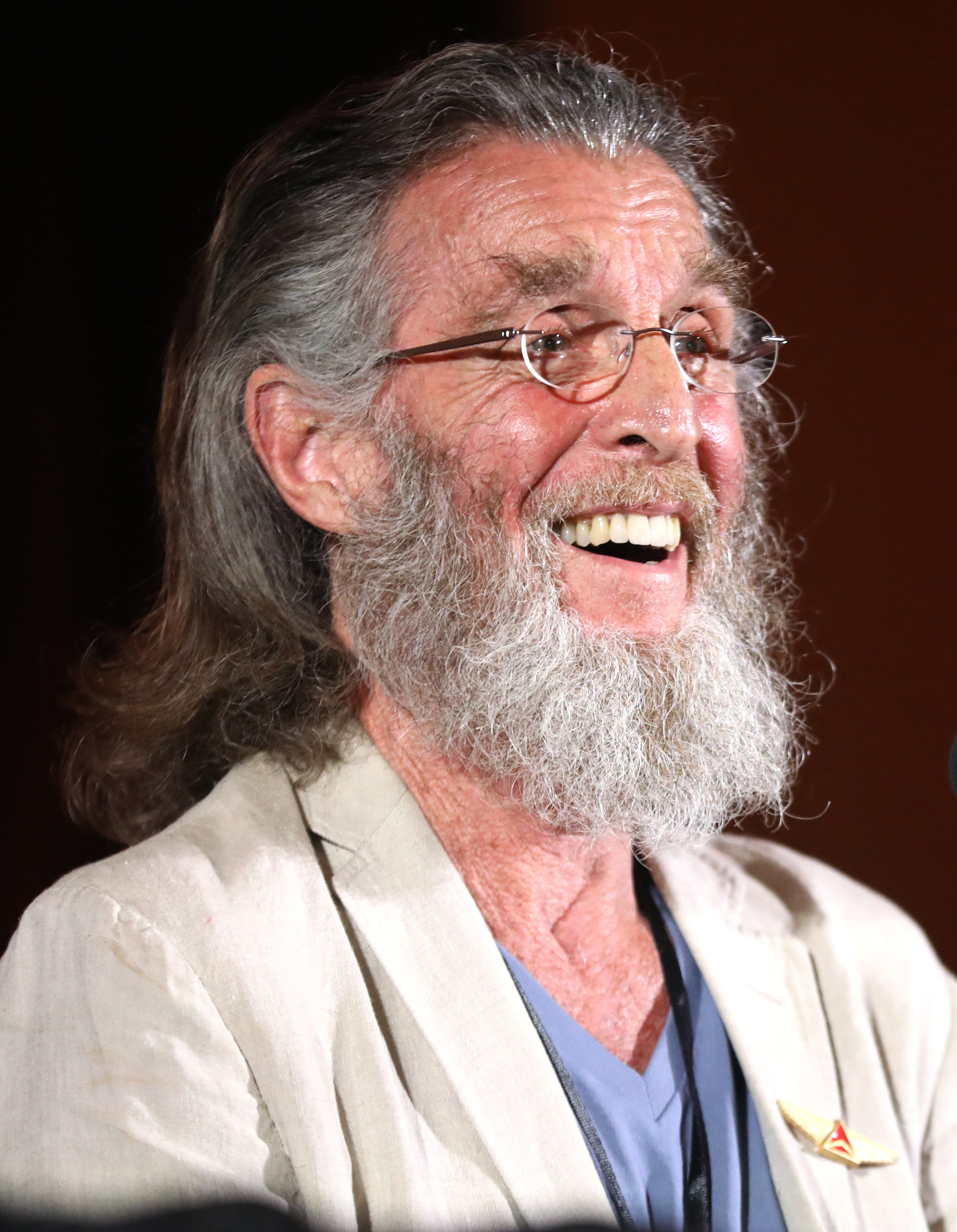
- Glover in 2024
- Born: August 7, 1944 (age 82); Kingston, New York, U.S.
- Education: Towson University
- Occupation: Actor
- Years active: 1970–present
- Spouse: Adam Kurtzman (m. 2016)

John Glover (/ˈɡlʌvər/ born August 7, 1944) is an American actor who has played a range of quirky and villainous roles in films and television, such as Lionel Luthor in Smallville, Dr. Jason Woodrue in Batman & Robin and the voice of Riddler in the DC Animated Universe. He also played the role of Daniel Clamp in Gremlins 2: The New Batch (1990).

== Early life ==
Glover was born in Kingston, New York, and raised in Salisbury, Maryland. His father was a television salesman. Glover attended Wicomico High School and acted at Towson University.

Glover began his career at the Barter Theatre in Abingdon, Virginia, and later studied acting at the Beverly Hills Playhouse under Milton Katselas.

== Career ==
Glover began his career in television, playing a mentally disturbed man who kidnapped Joanne, the lead character in Search for Tomorrow. One of his early film performances was a role as a U.S. diplomat in White Nights. His other roles include Alan Raimy in 52 Pick-Up, Bryce Cummings in Scrooged, Tony Gateworth in Masquerade, Daniel Clamp in Gremlins 2: The New Batch, a mobster in Payback, an advertising spokesman in RoboCop 2, Derek Mills in Night of the Running Man, the Riddler in Batman: The Animated Series, Doctor Jason Woodrue in Batman & Robin, Verad in the Star Trek: Deep Space Nine episode "Invasive Procedures", the Devil in the series Brimstone, and a recurring role in The Days and Nights of Molly Dodd as Cousin Jerry, from Bal'mer, a relative whom no one actually seemed to know.

In 1987, Glover appeared in the Miami Vice episode "Lend Me an Ear" as Steve Duddy. He also appeared in two episodes of Murder, She Wrote, "One White Rose for Death" and "When Thieves Fall Out". He appeared in the television film An Early Frost in 1985, the first TV film to confront the issue of AIDS, and received an Emmy nomination for his performance as a gay AIDS patient. In 1986, he appeared in the TV film Apology with Lesley Ann Warren.

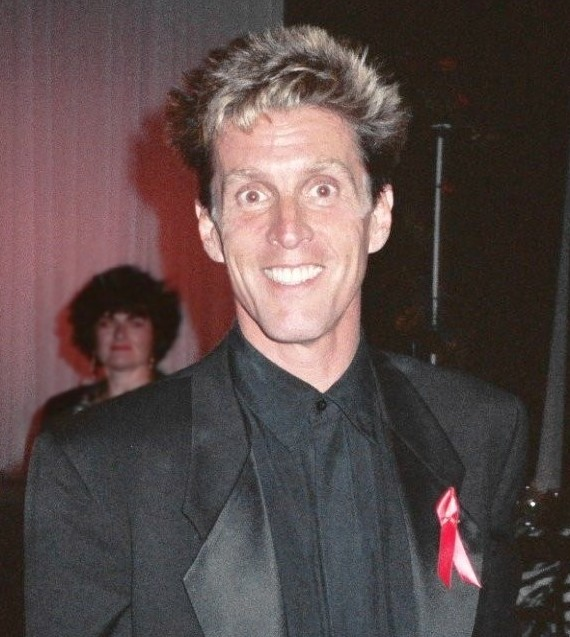
Glover at the 1991 Emmy Awards

Glover appeared in the role of Max Brodsky, an inmate in concentration camps and later a fighter for Israel's independence, in Ian Sharp's 1989 TV miniseries Twist of Fate (also known as Pursuit). That same year, he played a hard-driving immoral district sales manager in HBO's Traveling Man. He also received a 1994 Emmy nomination for Outstanding Guest Actor in a Comedy Series for his appearance in Frasier.

Glover played Lionel Luthor on Smallville from 2001 to 2008, where he performed as a guest actor in the show's first season and then appeared as a full cast member from seasons two to seven. He later returned in 2010 and 2011 for the tenth and final season as a parallel universe version of the character.

Glover had a small role in the Woody Allen film Annie Hall (1977) in a flashback in which he tells the title character, "Touch my heart. With your foot." He had a recurring role in Law & Order: Criminal Intent as Declan Gage, an old friend and mentor to Detective Robert Goren. On ABC's Brothers & Sisters Glover played Henry, the boyfriend of Saul Holden, in 2009. In Heroes he had a brief appearance as Samson Gray, the father of Sylar.

Glover had made notable appearances on stage, winning a Tony Award for Featured Actor in a Play for his dual roles in the Broadway play Love! Valour! Compassion!, which he reprised in the film version. In 2004, he performed with the Philadelphia Theatre Company staging of Edward Albee's The Goat, or Who Is Sylvia?

Glover also appeared as "man in the chair/narrator" in The Drowsy Chaperone on Broadway during the summer of 2007. He played the role of Lucky in a Broadway production of Samuel Beckett's Waiting for Godot, for which he earned a Tony Award nomination for Best Performance by a Featured Actor in a Play. In 2014, he appeared as Leonato in the Shakespeare in the Park production of Much Ado About Nothing.

Glover played Telemachus in Yuri Rasovsky's Peabody Award-winning radio dramatization of The Odyssey of Homer and has acted in several radio plays of the LA Theatre Works. Glover has also narrated audiobooks. In 2011, he performed the audiobook version of Ghost Story, the thirteenth novel in Jim Butcher's The Dresden Files series. In October and November 2011, he performed in David Bar Katz's drama The Atmosphere of Memory at the Bank Street Theatre in New York City, co-starring with Ellen Burstyn in a LAByrinth production. He played the role of Uncle Ben in the 2012 Broadway production of Arthur Miller's Death of a Salesman, directed by Mike Nichols. Glover rehearsed the role of John Kreese in behind-the-scenes pre-production footage from The Karate Kid, indicating he may have been considered for that role. In 2013, Glover starred in the horror anthology Sanitarium. He also guest-starred in an episode of Agent Carter. Glover has done various voice-over work for several projects related to Tron: Legacy: the villain Abraxas in Tron: Evolution, and Dyson in Tron: Uprising. In 2014, he guest-starred on The Blacklist in the episode titled "Berlin".

== Personal life ==
Glover is gay. He married sculptor Adam Kurtzman in 2016, whom he had been dating since 1993. Additionally, Glover claims to have slept with Freddie Mercury in the 1970s.

Glover is involved with the Alzheimer's Association. His father had Alzheimer's disease, leading Glover to become more active in charity and activism surrounding the disorder.

Glover returns to Towson annually to work with theater students. The theater department awards a scholarship in his name.

== Filmography ==
=== Film ===
List of films and roles
Year	Title	Role	Notes	Reference(s)
1973	Shamus	Johnnie		
1977	Annie Hall	Actor Boy Friend		
1977	Julia	Sammy		
1978	Somebody Killed Her Husband	Herbert Little		
1979	Last Embrace	Richard Peabody		
1980	The American Success Company	Ernst		
1980	The Mountain Men	Nathan Wyeth		
1980	Melvin and Howard	Freese, Attorney #2		
1981	The Incredible Shrinking Woman	Tom Keller		
1982	A Little Sex	Walter		
1984	The Evil That Men Do	Briggs		
1985	White Nights	Wynn Scott		
1986	A Killing Affair	Sheb Sheppard		
1986	52 Pick-Up	Alan Raimy		
1986	Willy/Milly	Fred Niceman		
1988	Masquerade	Tony Gateworth		
1988	Rocket Gibraltar	Rolo Rockwell		
1988	Scrooged	Brice Cummings		
1988	The Chocolate War	Brother Leon		
1989	Meet the Hollowheads	Henry Hollowhead		
1990	Gremlins 2: The New Batch	Daniel Clamp		
1990	RoboCop 2	Magnavolt Salesman		
1993	Ed and His Dead Mother	A.J. Pattle		
1994	In the Mouth of Madness	Saperstein		
1995	Night of the Running Man	Derek Mills		
1995	Automatic	Goddard Marx		
1997	Love! Valour! Compassion!	John Jeckyll / James Jeckyll		
1997	Batman & Robin	Dr. Jason Woodrue		
1997	Medusa's Child	Rogers Henry		
1998	Dead Broke	Sam		
1997	The Broken Giant	Bennett Hale		
1999	Payback	Phil		
1999	Macbeth in Manhattan	Richard, The Director		
2001	The Body	Jesus Christ Street Actor		
2001	On Edge	Yuri Moskvin		
2002	Mid-Century	Bill Gates		
2004	Tricks	Ralph		
2004	A Kiss at Kerouac's Grave	Will		
2005	The Civilization of Maxwell Bright	Ogden		
2013	Sanitarium	Gustav	Segment: "Figuratively Speaking"	
2013	Sweet Talk	Professor / Count		
2014	Reality	Zog		
2015	You Bury Your Own	Detective Gillespie		
2016	We Go On	Dr. Ellison		
2019	Shazam!	Mr. Sivana		
2022	Fatal Influence: Like. Follow. Survive	The Grand Zel		
2025	The Home	Lou		

=== Television ===
List of television appearances and roles
Year	Title	Role	Notes	Reference(s)
1975	Kojak	Billy Jo	Episode: "Elegy in an Asphalt Graveyard"	
1984	George Washington	Charles Lee	Episode: "Charles Lee"	
1985	ABC Afterschool Specials	Mr. Stewart	Episode: "Don't Touch"	
1985	An Early Frost	Victor DiMato	Television film	
1986	The Twilight Zone	The Alien Ambassador	Episode: "A Small Talent for War"	
1986	Apology	Philip	Cable television film	
1986	Murder, She Wrote	Franz Mueller	Episode: "One White Rose for Death"	
1987	Nutcracker: Money, Madness and Murder	Richard Behrens	Episode: 1-3 (entire miniseries)	
1987	Miami Vice	Steve Duddy	Episode: "Lend Me an Ear"	
1987	Murder, She Wrote	Andrew Durbin	Episode: "When Thieves Fall Out"	
1988	David	Charles Rothenberg	Television film	
1989	Breaking Point	Dr. Gerber	Television film	
1989	Twist of Fate	Max Brodsky	TV miniseries	
1989	The Hitchhiker	Miles Duchet	Episode: "Striptease"	
1990	El Diablo	Autolycus, The Peacher	Television film	
1991	What Ever Happened to...	Billy Korn	Television film	
1991	Tales from the Crypt	Sebastian Esbrook	Episode: "Undertaking Palor"	
1992	Drug Wars: The Cocaine Cartel	"Loco" Garrison	Television film	
1992	The Ray Bradbury Theater	Walter Grip	Episode: "Silent Towns"	
1993	Frasier	Ned Miller	Episode: "Oops"	
1993	Crime & Punishment	Dennis Atwood	Episode: "Best Laid Plans"; Nominated for Emmy Award for Outstanding Guest Actor in a Drama Series	
1993	The Legend of Prince Valiant	King Edward	Voice, episode: "The Blackest Poison"	
1993	Animaniacs	Rasputin	Voice, episode: "Nothing but the Tooth"	
1993	Star Trek: Deep Space Nine	Verad	Episode: "Invasive Procedures"	
1992–1994	Dinosaurs	Babysitter / Prosecutor / Lucius	Voice, 3 episodes	
1992–1994	Batman: The Animated Series	Edward Nygma / Riddler	Voice, 3 episodes	
1998	Superman: The Animated Series	Edward Nygma / Riddler	Voice, episode: "Knight Time"	
1998	The New Batman Adventures	Edward Nygma / Riddler	Voice, episode: "Judgement Day"	
1998	Pinky and the Brain	Tycoon	Voice, episode: "Pinky's Turn"	
1998–1999	Brimstone	The Devil, Angel	13 episodes	
1999–2001	Haunted History	The Narrator	Voice, 25 episodes	
2001–2008, 2010-2011	Smallville	Lionel Luthor	145 episodes	
2006–2009	Numb3rs	Samuel Craft, The Psychic	2 episodes	
2006–2008	Law & Order: Criminal Intent	Declan Gage	2 episodes	
2009	Heroes	Samson Gray	Episode: "Shades of Gray"	
2009	Brothers & Sisters	Henry Mittner	Episode: "Owning It"	
2011–2015	The Good Wife	Jared Andrews	4 episodes	
2012–2013	Tron: Uprising	Dyson	Voice, 4 episodes	
2014	The Blacklist	Dr. Bruce Sanders	Episode: "Berlin"	
2014	Perception	The Devil	Episode: "Possession"	
2015	Agent Carter	SSR Informant	Episode: "The Iron Ceiling"	
2017	The Lost Wife of Robert Durst	Seymour Durst	Television film	
2019	The Good Fight	Jared Andrews	Episode: "The One Where a Nazi Gets Punched"	
2019	Tales of the City	Bill Schwartz	Episode: "Next Level Sh*t"	
2019	Evil	Byron Duke	Episode: "3 Stars"	
2021	Fear the Walking Dead	Theodore "Teddy" Maddox	5 episodes	
2021	Lucifer	Peter Peterson	Episode: "Family Dinner"	
2022	Dead in the Water: A Fear the Walking Dead Story	Theodore "Teddy" Maddox	Web series; episode: "This Ain't It"	
2023–2025	And Just Like That...	Elliot	3 episodes	
2025	Gremlins	Rodney	Voice, episode: "Never Get Out of the Truck"	

=== Theatre ===
List of theatre roles
Year	Title	Role	Notes	Reference(s)
1977	The Importance of Being Earnest	Algernon Moncrieff		
1981	Frankenstein	Henry Clerval		
1984	Design for Living	Leo		
2012	Death of a Salesman	Ben Loman		
2009	Waiting for Godot	Lucky		
2013–2014	Macbeth	Witch, Porter, Third Murderer		
2018	Saint Joan	The Archbishop of Rheims, A Gentleman		
2025	Life, Death, and Other Opportunities	TBA		

=== Video games ===
List of video game voice roles
Year	Title	Role	Notes	Reference(s)
1994	The Adventures of Batman & Robin	Edward Nygma / Riddler		
2003	Wallace & Gromit in Project Zoo	Help Points		
2010	Tron: Evolution	Abraxas, Jalen		

=== Audiobooks ===
List of audiobook roles
Year	Title	Author	Notes	Reference(s)
1992	The Thief of Always (abridged)	Clive Barker		
1999	Night Shift	Stephen King		
1999	The Lawnmower Man	Stephen King		
1999	Gray Matter	Stephen King		
1999	Thank You for Smoking	Christopher Buckley		
2009	Level 26: Dark Origins	Anthony E. Zuiker		
2010	Worst Case	James Patterson and Michael Ledwidge		
2010	The Bride Collector	Ted Dekker		
2010	The Tempest	William Shakespeare		
2010	Star Wars: Red Harvest	Joe Schreiber		
2011	Gideon's Sword	Douglas Preston and Lincoln Child		
2011	Dracula (Dramatized)	Bram Stoker and Charles Morey		
