= The Lost Books (novel series) =

Book series by Ted Dekker

- box set
- Chosen; Infidel; Renegade; Chaos; Lunatic; Elyon
- Author: Ted Dekker, and Kaci Hill for Lunatic and Elyon
- Language: English
- Genre: Fiction; Christian; Young adult
- Publisher: Thomas Nelson
- Media type: Print

The Lost Books series is a hexalogy of fantasy books written by American author Ted Dekker. When the first letter of each books is taken individually, they spell "Circle". The 6 young-adult novels span the 15-year gap between Black and Red in Dekker's popular Circle Series, and also beyond.

== Plot ==
=== Chosen (Book 1) ===
Thirteen years have passed since the lush, coloured forests were turned to desert by Teeleh, the enemy of Elyon and the vilest of all creatures. Evil now rules the land and shows itself as a painful, and scaly disease that covers the flesh of the Horde, a people who live in the desert. The powerful green waters, once precious to Elyon, have all vanished from the Earth except for seven small forests surrounding seven small lakes. Those few who have chosen to follow the ways of Elyon now live in those forests, bathing once daily in the powerful waters to rid themselves of the disease. The number of their sworn enemy, the Horde, has grown in thirteen years and, fearing the green waters above all else, these desert dwellers, have sworn to wipe all traces of the forests from the Earth. Only the forest guard stand in their way. Ten thousand elite fighters against an army of nearly four hundred thousand Horde. But the forest guard is starting to crumble. In an attempt to raise the number of the Forest Guard, the leader (Thomas Hunter) lowers the recruitment age to 16. Four teens are chosen to be the leaders of the forest. To be inducted they must each find and bring back a catalina cacti, a cactus plant. While out, they are attacked by Horde scouts. The main character of the four, Johnis, managed to lure the scouts away, and ends up at a dead end. He finally gets away and they return safely.

=== Infidel (Book 2) ===
Once home, Michal comes and gives Johnis a ring that belonged to the latter's mother, Rosa, before she was taken and supposedly killed by the Horde. Johnis quickly sets out to rescue his mother, whom he believes is in the Horde city across the desert. He, at first, illegally takes command of a Forest Guard division and leads them across the desert where they are slaughtered and he is only saved by the armies of Thomas Hunter who came to the rescue. Back home, Johnis is left to the council to decide his fate, but they let him go. He heads across the desert again with Silvie, the second chosen. At the outskirts of the Horde city they find Karas, daughter of the local priest—who owns the next book, as well as Johnis' mother—and helps them infiltrate the area. Inside they are captured, but saved by the other chosen Darsal and Billos. They escape with the third book, Rosa and Karas, who accepts Elyon and is accepted by Thomas.

=== Renegade (Book 3) ===
Billos takes the books, overwhelmed by the power inside, and touches blood to one of them. Immediately both he and the books disappear into another world. Here, Billos climbs in a machine from our time, which is a virtual reality machine, though he doesn't know it (and it doesn't specifically say in the book, although it does say Dell, which can lead you to this conclusion). When he wakes up he is confronted by Marsuveus Black, a mysterious man who gives Billos 'suhupow,' short for 'superhuman power,' as in the ability to create objects at will and affect the world around. Billos goes on a killing spree in the nearby town, known as Paradise. He is killed, but wakes up again and re-tries to get the books, which are along the shelf of a saloon. In the Other Earth, the chosen Darsal, Billos' romance, tries to help him, but cannot without a book. She goes alone to Alucard's lair and trades him his book for all of theirs when they retrieve them, or—in the event she goes against her word—either her or Billos' life. He accepts and lets her travel to the world Billos is in, accompanied by Karas who snuck along. Inside they do not accept Black's powers and manage to bring Billos back with the books. With those four they are able to travel to Thomas' earth. In Alucard' lair they find that Johnis and Silvie have come to try and stop her and started a battle with thousands of Shaitiki. With no hope to escape they start to use the books—Alucard and Silvie by one, Karas by one, Johnis by one, and leaving only one for the last two—Darsal and Billos. By not giving the books to Alucard, one must give up their life. Billos sacrifices himself, and Darsal uses the last book to leave while the Shataiki break down the door.

=== Chaos (Book 4) ===
In Earth, Silvie and Johnis hijack a car and, after quickly learning how to use it, speed on to nearby Las Vegas, being chased by cops along the away. Johnis is arrested and Silvie escapes, but they end up together when Johnis won't go quietly and Silvie begs over TV. After seeing the broadcast, Johnis and Silvie are bailed by a much older Karas, who has been in the world for about 10 years and become a famous millionaire. They put their books together and think of what to do, but the books are stolen by a mysterious figure and Alucard, who has been there thousands of years. They go to Alucard's hiding place in Romania and find out the last three book of history's locations. They get the books and break into Alucard's lair while no one is home. The mysterious woman arrives and reveals herself to be Darsal, about ten years older, and shrouded in darkness about Billos' death. She captures the heroes and gives all the books to Alucard, who starts to use them. After a pleading speech from Johnis, Darsal, at the last minute, attack and kills Alucard, as well as the Shaitiki that are bridging the worlds. The four leave and are met by Michal and Gabil. The Roush tell them that if they return home via Roush, about five years will have passed because of all they know (this means that they will arrive about 2 years after White's story). Karas elects to remain on Earth because she's all set there, but the others return. Thus is the end of the fourth book.

=== Lunatic (Book 5) ===
Johnis, Silvie, and Darsal have returned from the other earth, having claimed all of the lost books of history only to lose them again. More importantly, the world that they have returned to has changed completely. Their home is overrun by their enemies and the healing water of Elyon no longer heals. The Horde has overrun Middle Forest and the lakes have turned from green to red. No longer can albinos bathe once a day and keep the scab disease from taking their bodies and minds. Now they must drown once to forever to prevent themselves from becoming Horde. Johnis and his friends uncover a Horde plot by Marak to slaughter every albino alive. Their only hope is to find a way to control the Shataiki and have them destroy the Horde, since albino numbers are too small. This requires an alliance with the enemy and with a being who seeks to help them.

=== Elyon (Book 6) ===
Elyon's lakes have turned blood red. Shaeda has one blue eye and one purple eye. No one fully knows her story, but her mere gaze eats away at the core of one's being. In his quest for power, Johnis now finds himself in her intoxicating grip. Assumed identities, a magic amulet, the fearsome Shataiki bats, and a troubling alliance with the Dark Priest all converge against the three remaining chosen. Only Elyon knows what will happen when the forces of ultimate good and evil clash in their final battle.

== Publication history ==
Chosen and Infidel were simultaneously released on December 15, 2007. Renegade and Chaos were released May 1, 2008. Lunatic and Elyon were released June 2, 2009.

== Sources ==
- Dekker, Ted (2007). Chosen. Thomas Nelson. p. 260.
- Dekker, Ted (2007). Infidel. Thomas Nelson. p. 245.
- Dekker, Ted (2008). Renegade. Thomas Nelson.
- Dekker, Ted (2008). Chaos. Thomas Nelson. ISBN 9781595543721.
- Dekker, Ted (2009). Lunatic. Thomas Nelson.
- Dekker, Ted (2009). Elyon. Thomas Nelson. p. 304.
