= Infidel (disambiguation) =

Infidel is an unbeliever.

Infidel or Infidels may also refer to:

- in a context of Islam, a translation of kafir

== Film, TV, books and games ==
- The Infidel (1922 film), a 1922 film featuring Boris Karloff
- The Infidel (2010 film), a 2010 film
- Infidel (film), a 2020 film starring Jim Caviezel
- Infidel (video game), a 1983 Infocom text adventure
- Infidel: My Life, a 2007 book by Ayaan Hirsi Ali
- Infidel (novel), a novel by Ted Dekker
- Beloved Infidel (1959 film), based on memoir by Sheilah Graham

== Music ==
- Infidels (band), a Canadian funk-rock band from the 1990s, or their self-titled album
- Infidels (album), a 1983 album by Bob Dylan
- The Infidel (album), a 1991 album by the band Doubting Thomas
- "Infidel", a song by Muslimgauze
- "Infidel", a song by Five for Fighting from the 2003 album The Battle for Everything

== See also ==
- Fidel Castro, Communist leader of Cuba who is sometimes incorrectly called Infidel Castro
- Internet Infidels, a nonprofit educational organization
- Infidelity
- Irreligion
