= In the Blink of an Eye =

In the Blink of an Eye may refer to:

== Music ==
- "In the Blink of an Eye", a 2003 song by A-Teens
- "In the Blink of an Eye" (song), a 2004 song by MercyMe
- In the Blink of an Eye (album), a 2009 album by FACT

== Films ==
- In the Blink of an Eye, a 1996 film directed by Micki Dickoff
- In the Blink of an Eye (2009 film), a film directed by Michael Sinclair
- In the Blink of an Eye (2026 film), a science fiction film directed by Andrew Stanton

== Books ==
- In the Blink of an Eye: How Vision Sparked the Big Bang of Evolution, a 2004 book by Andrew Parker
- In the Blink of an Eye (Murch book), a 2005 book by Walter Murch

== See also ==
- Blink of an Eye (disambiguation)
- In ictu oculi, a Latin expression meaning in the blink of an eye
- "In the Blink", a storyline in the science fiction comedy webtoon series Live with Yourself!
