= Blink of an Eye =

Blink of an Eye may refer to:

- Blinking, rapid movement of an eyelid
- Blink of an Eye (Enchant album), 2002
- Blink of an Eye (Ricochet album), 1997
- Blink of an Eye (Rob Brown and Matthew Shipp album), 1997
- Blink of an Eye (Michael McDonald album), 1993
- "Blink of an Eye" (Star Trek: Voyager), an episode of Star Trek: Voyager
- Blink of an Eye, a 1992 film directed by Bob Misiorowski
- Blink of an Eye (film), a 2019 documentary film directed by Paul Taublieb
- Blink of an Eye (novel) (originally Blink), a 2003 novel by Ted Dekker
- "Blink of an Eye" (Ricochet song), 1997
- "Blink of an Eye" (Tori Kelly song), 2016
- "Blink of an Eye", a song by Damageplan from New Found Power

== See also ==
- In the Blink of an Eye (disambiguation)
