= Sovereign (Dekker and Lee novel) =

Science fiction fantasy novel by Ted Dekker and Tosca Lee

- First edition
- Author: Ted Dekker & Tosca Lee
- Language: English
- Series: Book of Mortals
- Genre: Christian Fiction
- Published: 09-20113 (FaithWords)
- Publication place: United States
- Media type: Print
- Pages: 336
- ISBN: 9781599953557
- Preceded by: Mortal

Sovereign is a science fiction fantasy novel by Ted Dekker and Tosca Lee, published in June 2013. It is the conclusion in the trilogy, and was preceded by the novels Forbidden in June 2011 and Mortal (novel) in June 2012.

== Plot Introduction ==
In the nine years after Rom Sebastian became the hero of the land, his alliance has suffered enormous setbacks. Only 36 of his truly alive followers survived. A huge battle with the government The Order has left them scattered and deeply divided, unsure of their strategy and power.

Losing hope, Rom and the team must band together and find new allies against The Order, more evil and virulent than ever.
