= Here with Me (MercyMe song) =

Single by MercyMe

from the album Undone
- Released: April 2004
- Recorded: 2004 at various locations
- Genre: Contemporary Christian, pop, rock
- Length: 4:09 (album version); 3:58 (Hot mix/light mix/radio mix); 3:49 (Vocal intro mix)
- Label: INO/Curb
- Songwriters: James Bryson, Nathan Cochran, Barry Graul, Pete Kipley, Dan Muckala, Bradley Russell, Michael John Scheuchzer, Bart Millard, Robin Shaffer
- Producer: Kipley

MercyMe singles chronology
"The Change Inside Of Me" (2003)	"Here with Me" (2004)	"Homesick" (2004)

"Here with Me" is a song by Christian rock band MercyMe. Written and composed by the band, as well as Peter Kipely, Dan Muckala, and Brad Russell, "Here with Me" is a ballad with a musical style influenced by worship, pop, and rock music; the overall sound has been compared to that of alternative rock band Coldplay. "Here with Me" lyrically discusses the omnipresence of God.

Released as the lead single from MercyMe's 2004 album, Undone, "Here with Me" attained positive critical reception and peaked at No. 1 on multiple Christian radio chart formats; it also peaked inside the top 40 on several mainstream radio formats. It ranked No. 16 on the 2000s decade-end Hot Christian Songs and Hot Christian AC charts. The song appeared on WOW Hits 2005.

== Background and production ==
"Here with Me" was written and composed by MercyMe, Dan Muckala, Brad Russell, and Peter Kipley. It was recorded at several locations: Blueberry Hill, Sound Stage, Abbey Road Studios, The Indigo Room, Maximedia, Luminous Sound, and The Schwoodio. Recording was handled by F. Reid Shippen, Mike O'Connor, and Steve Bishir; the strings on the song were arranged by Rob Mathes and recorded by Simon Rhodes at Abbey Road Studios. "Here with Me" was mixed by Shippen and produced by Kipley, while the mastering for the song was handled by Ted Jensen at Sterling Sound.

== Composition ==
Here with Me
An audio sample of the first chorus from "Here with Me", which demonstrates a rock and pop sound similar to Coldplay.

"Here with Me" is a ballad with a length of four minutes and nine seconds. It is set in common time in the key of B major (Mixolydian mode), with a moderate tempo of eighty-four beats per minute and a vocal range spanning from B_{3}-G♯_{5}. The musical vibe of "Here with Me" has been compared to that of Coldplay and Robbie Williams. The song has influences from pop, rock, and worship. It features a musical crescendo that has been described as similar to "I Can Only Imagine". The lyrical content of the song has been described as having a devotional bent, and conveys a theme of God's omnipresence and holiness. "Here with Me" also attempts to comprehend the mystery of God's love.

== Reception ==
=== Critical reception ===
"Here with Me" received generally positive reviews from critics. Johnny Joftus of Allmusic commented, "...the lush 'Here With Me' might be a Robbie Williams pop gem were it not for its devotional bent." David McCreary of CCM Magazine opined on his review of Undone, "One surefire hit is 'Here With Me,' the album’s first single ... A captivating piano-driven ballad, the song vividly conveys the wonder of God’s omnipresence and holiness and features a rousing crescendo rivaling that of 'Imagine'." Russ Breimeier of Christianity Today International commented that the song was "worshipful", also opining that it "struggle[s] with comprehending the mystery and enormity of God's love."

=== Chart performance ===
"Here with Me" debuted at No. 40 on the Hot Christian Songs chart for the week of April 3, 2004. The song advanced to No. 10 in its sixth chart week, and to No. 5 in its eighth chart week, holding that spot for three consecutive weeks. In its sixteenth chart week, "Here with Me" advanced to its peak of No. 1, holding that spot for eleven consecutive weeks. It dropped to No. 2 in its twenty-seventh chart week, holding that spot for two weeks before returning to No. 1 for two more weeks. "Here with Me" dropped to No. 3 in its thirty-first chart week, and spent a further eight weeks on the chart before dropping out. In all, "Here with Me" spent thirty-nine weeks on the Hot Christian Songs chart, thirteen of them at No. 1. On the Adult Contemporary chart, "Here with Me" debuted at No. 24 for the chart week of May 15, 2004. "Here with Me" advanced to No. 19 in its sixth chart week, holding that spot for three consecutive weeks. In its nineteenth chart week, it advanced to its peak of No. 12, and spent a further seven weeks on the chart before dropping out. In all, "Here with Me" spent twenty-six weeks on the Adult Contemporary chart.

On the Adult Top 40 chart, "Here with Me" debuted at No. 38 for the chart week of August 28, 2004. It spent an additional week on the chart before dropping out, after spending two weeks on the chart. "Here with Me" also peaked at No. 1 on the Billboard Hot Christian AC chart (spending ten weeks at No. 1), the Radio & Records Christian AC chart (spending seven weeks at No. 1), and the Radio & Records Inspo chart (spending five weeks at No. 1), as well as peaking at No. 2 on the Radio & Records Christian CHR chart. "Here with Me" ranked No. 4 on the 2004 year-end Hot Christian Singles and Tracks Titles and Hot Christian Adult Contemporary Titles charts, as well as No. 19 on the year-end Adult Contemporary Singles and Tracks chart. Additionally, it ranked No. 16 on both the 2000s decade-end Hot Christian Songs and Hot Christian AC charts.

== Formats and track listing ==
US promotional single (INO)

1. "Here with Me" – 3:58
2. "Here with Me (Light Remix)" – 3:58
3. "Here with Me (Vocal Intro Remix) – 3:49
4. "Here with Me (Hot Remix)" – 3:58

US promotional single (INO/Curb)

1. "Here with Me" - 3:58

== Charts ==
Weekly charts

Chart (2004)	Peak Position
US Billboard Hot Christian Songs	1
US Billboard Hot Christian AC	1
US Radio & Records Christian AC	1
US Radio & Records INSPO	1
US Radio & Records Christian CHR	2
US Radio & Records Adult Contemporary	10
US Billboard Adult Contemporary	12
US Billboard Adult Top 40	38

Year-end charts

Chart (2004)	Position
US Billboard Hot Christian Singles and Tracks Titles	4
US Billboard Hot Christian Adult Contemporary Titles	4
US Billboard Hot Adult Contemporary Singles and Tracks	19

Decade-end charts

Chart (2000s)	Position
Billboard Hot Christian Songs	16
Billboard Hot Christian AC	16
