= BoneMan's Daughters =

2009 novel by Ted Dekker

BoneMan’s Daughters
- First edition
- Author: Ted Dekker
- Language: English
- Genre: Suspense thriller
- Publisher: Center Street
- Publication date: 1 April 2009 (1st edition)
- Publication place: United States
- Media type: Print
- Pages: 417
- ISBN: 9780446547208

BoneMan’s Daughters is a 2009 suspense thriller novel by Ted Dekker. It was a New York Times bestselling novel for 2009. It was listed on The New York Times bestselling E-book list for November 2011.

== Plot summary ==
Boneman is a serial killer who has abducted six young women. He believes that he is the perfect father, and he is looking for the perfect daughter. People might think that he is killing these girls based on sexual interest, but that is not what he is after. He is looking for a girl who is perfect enough to be his own daughter. When he abducts a girl and discovers she doesn’t measure up to his perfection, he proceeds to break her bones, which ends up killing her. He is careful when breaking bones as he applies the right amount of pressure to make sure he doesn’t break through the skin. He picks his victims based on their looks, and he wants them to appear unscathed. Boneman is very meticulous with his looks, and makes sure that he doesn’t miss his Noxzema skin cream.

Ryan Evans is a naval intelligence officer whose career has separated him from his family. He has left his wife and daughter, who are trying to live without him. He doubts that he can be the father he feels he needs to be, and his wife and daughter have removed him from their lives.

During a mission in Iraq his life is changed and it has caused him to re-think the decisions that he has made about his family, he discovers how much regret he has about his decisions. He wants his family back and decides that he will come home and fight to have them back in his life. When Ryan returns home he notices that his wife and daughter are not eager to have him back home. Ryan discovers his wife has found another man to comfort her, and his daughter Bethany has decided to live life all on her own.

Ryan’s daughter becomes the Boneman’s seventh victim, and his world changes. With conflict going on in his family, the authorities suspect that he might be the Boneman. When the evidence is not enough to accuse him of being the Boneman, he decides to rescue Bethany from the psychopath. The FBI looks at the case differently and with new evidence pointing at Ryan being the Boneman they begin to seek him out. Ryan has to find his daughter, and he will do whatever he needs to in order to save her so he can be with her again.
