= Homesick (MercyMe song) =

Single by MercyMe

from the album Undone
- Released: November 2004
- Recorded: 2004
- Genre: Contemporary Christian
- Length: 3:41
- Label: INO Records
- Songwriter: Bart Millard
- Producer: Pete Kipley

MercyMe singles chronology
"Here with Me" (2004)	"Homesick" (2004)	"In the Blink of an Eye" (2005)

"Homesick" is a song by Christian rock band MercyMe. Written by Bart Millard, the song is an expression of grief and longing that was written after the band experienced the deaths of nine people they were connected to in a short period of time. "Homesick" was included on MercyMe's third studio album Undone and was released as the second single from that album.

"Homesick" received positive critical reception, with some critics considering the song one of the best from Undone. "Homesick" was successful on both Christian and mainstream radio, peaking at the top on the Radio & Records Christian AC Indicator and Soft AC/INSPO charts, number 3 on the Billboard Hot Christian Songs and Hot Christian AC charts and the Radio & Records Christian AC chart, as well as peaking at number 9 on the Billboard Adult Contemporary chart. It was ranked at number 13 on the Billboard 2005 year-end Hot Christian Songs and Hot Christian AC charts, and at number 20 on the year-end Adult Contemporary chart.

== Background ==
"Homesick" was written during a time of hardship for the band—nine people close to MercyMe's band members had died in a short span of time. Lead singer Bart Millard initially wrote the chorus to "Homesick" following a funeral service for two infants that died in utero, but did not finish the song, as didn’t want to fake his way through writing the song. However, following the death of Millard's brother-in-law, Chris, in a car accident, Millard finished the song so as to play it at Chris's funeral. Millard and the rest of MercyMe intended the song only to be played once—at Chris's funeral—but Millard's mother-in-law encouraged them to record it. Although the record they were going to release, Undone, was essentially complete, the band returned to the studio to record "Homesick" for inclusion on the project.

== Composition ==
Homesick
An audio sample of "Homesick", a ballad.

"Homesick" is a ballad with a length of three minutes and forty-one seconds. Lyrically, the song is an expression of grief, pondering Heaven and the time it takes to get there, as well as anger, confusion, and brokenness. The song is set in the key of F major and has a moderate tempo of 72 beats per minute. Millard's vocal range in the song spans from C_{4}–A_{5}.

Some comparisons have been made between the lyrical content of "Homesick" and MercyMe's 2001 single "I Can Only Imagine." David Jenison of CCM Magazine referred to the song as the 'sequel' to "I Can Only Imagine." Regarding these comparisons, Millard said "’I Can Only Imagine’ took the focus off of what you are going through and was comforting because it put the focus on where they were going... ’Homesick’ is the opposite because it completely addresses us that are left here. I don’t think as a Christian that it’s right for me to say, ‘I wish you could’ve stayed here,’ because truthfully, we’re getting the raw end of the deal if we really believe what we say that heaven is as great as we want it to be. The whole idea is that we’re the ones who have to wait.” Millard has also noted, "The difference with ‘Homesick’ [as compared to "I Can Only Imagine"] is that it talks about those who are stuck around here after someone passes away. When you lose somebody, you learn what being homesick is really about."

== Reception ==
=== Critical reception ===
Critical reception to "Homesick" was generally positive. Allmusic reviewer Johnny Loftus selected the song as a track pick on his review of Undone, commenting that "[Homesick] is a delicate ballad about being apart." Russ Breimeier of The Fish noted, "The beautiful ballad 'Homesick' is both similar to and an improvement on 'Imagine', the difference in how it focuses on persevering on earth in anticipation of heaven". Kim Jones of About.com commented, "'Homesick' is the true gem on this release," also opining, "Should it be a radio release, I won't be a bit surprised to see it in the number one spot for many, many weeks".

=== Chart performance ===
"Homesick" debuted at number 35 on the Billboard Hot Christian Songs chart for the chart week of November 13, 2004, advancing to number 6 four weeks later. The song held that spot for three weeks before advancing to its peak position of number 3 for the chart week of January 1, 2005. "Homesick" dropped to number 11 the next week, but returned to the top ten and, after spending two weeks at number 5 and number 7, respectively, "Homesick" spent ten consecutive weeks in the top five of the chart. After dropping out of the top five, the song spent nine more weeks on the chart before dropping out. In all, the song spent a total of thirty weeks on the chart.

On the Billboard Adult Contemporary chart, "Homesick" debuted at number 32 for the chart week of February 12, 2005. The song spent seventeen more weeks on the chart before reaching its peak of number 9 for the chart week of June 18, 2005. In all, the song spent twenty-six weeks on the chart.

"Homesick" also peaked at number 3 on the Billboard Hot Christian AC and the R&R Christian AC charts, spending twenty-eight weeks on both. On the R&R Christian AC Indicator chart the song peaked at number 1, spending a total of five weeks at the top spot and 25 weeks on the chart in total. On the R&R Soft AC/INSPO chart, "Homesick" spent one week at the top spot and twenty weeks on it total. "Homesick" also spent four weeks on Christian CHR chart, peaking at number 27.

== Charts ==
=== Weekly charts ===
Chart (2004–2005)	Peak Position
U.S. R&R Christian AC Indicator	1
U.S. R&R Soft AC/INSPO	1
U.S. Billboard Hot Christian Songs	3
U.S. Billboard Hot Christian AC	3
U.S. R&R Christian AC	3
U.S. Billboard Adult Contemporary	9
U.S. R&R Christian CHR	27

=== Year-end charts ===
Chart (2005)	Position
Billboard Christian Songs	13
Billboard Hot Christian AC	13
Billboard Hot Adult Contemporary Tracks	20

=== Decade-end charts ===
Chart (2000s)	Position
Billboard Hot Christian AC	73
