= Adam (novel) =

2008 novel by Ted Dekker

- First edition cover
- Author: Ted Dekker
- Language: English
- Genre: Thriller novel
- Published: 2008 Thomas Nelson
- Publication place: United States
- Media type: Print (hardback & paperback)
- Pages: 400 pp (first edition, hardback)
- ISBN: 978-1-59554-007-2 (first edition, hardback)
- OCLC: 164803049
- Dewey Decimal: 813/.54 22
- LC Class: PS3554.E43 A66 2008

Adam, a novel by author Ted Dekker, was released on April 1, 2008. This book is not directly tied to any others, as many of Dekker's novels are.

== Christian Retail Version ==
There is a version of the book that is sold exclusively to Christian retail stores. This version contains the full novel, plus an extra chapter at the end, making the final chapter number forty-three, and a conversation between Dekker and John Eldredge. The cover has a blue tint with "Adam" in white letters and a red border at the top signifying itself as the Christian retail version.

== Plot synopsis ==
=== Backstory ===
The story is interspersed with the story of a brother and sister, Alex and Jessica Price, who are kidnapped from their home in 1964. Their kidnappers, Alice and Cyril, are insane fanatics dedicated to a religion called Eve's Holy Coven. After living in Alice's shack for over sixteen years, the siblings finally escape. They slowly begin to adapt to the real world, though Alex suffers severe psychological damage from his time with Alice. After failing to become a priest, Alex falls into depression and awakes in the middle of the night, screaming in terror. Jessica (who shares an apartment with him) begins to fear for her brother's sanity after he brutally attacks her fiance', Bruce. Shortly after this, Alex disappears and is never heard from again.

=== Plot ===
Daniel Clark is a behavioral psychologist who works for the FBI. For the past 16 months he has been stalking a killer called Eve who kills a young woman during every new moon using a deadly new strain of meningitis injected into the brain. His obsession with the serial killer causes his wife to divorce him. On the eve of the killer's sixteenth murder, Daniel and his new partner, pathologist Lori Ames, manage to extract Eve's victim before she has succumb to the disease. However, Eve intercepts them, killing Daniel with a bullet to the head and reclaiming his victim. In a frantic attempt to save Daniel, Lori manages to resuscitate after he has been clinically dead for almost a half-hour.

Despite escaping with his life, Daniel now experiences amnesia and cannot remember seeing the killer's face; also, he now suffers from spastic episodes of fear every hour or so. Still determined to find Eve, Daniel convinces Lori to drug him into having a second near-death experience, which he believes will trigger his memory of the night he saw Eve's face. She hesitantly agrees, and injects him with drugs that trick his brain into thinking he is dead. Instead of reliving the experience, he has a haunting dream of a young boy claiming himself to be Eve.

Meanwhile, Daniel's ex-wife Heather has been tracking the Eve case for several months. After receiving cryptic phone calls from a man she believes to be Eve, she is kidnapped. Daniel tracks her down using the clues given to him by the boy in his dreams. After tracking Heather to an abandoned tunnel, he encounters Eve and willingly trades his life for Heather's. Eve's nature is here revealed to be supernatural, having possessed Alex Price and manipulated him into killing women so Alex can "atone" for sins. Heather enlists the help of Father Seymour, the priest who trained Alex before he left the faith. Together, they track down Daniel only to find that he is now possessed by Eve, having "accepted" Eve "into his heart". Father Seymour attempts to perform an exorcism on Daniel. Alex is present, though he only stands aside and tells them how futile their attempts are. Lori arrives and reveals herself to be Jessica Price, and manages to convince her brother into letting go of Eve. The spirit, angered, leaves Daniel and attacks the siblings, almost killing Alex before it disappears.

In the aftermath, Alex is sentenced to life in prison and Jessica goes on to teach Medicine. Daniel, an agnostic before his possession by Eve, remembers crying out to God during his ordeal and knows that Eve was dispelled by a Bright Light he had always claimed never existed.

== Movie ==
Lions Gate Entertainment (the company who has previously bought the rights to Ted Dekker's latest movie adaptation House), bought the rights to distribute a film version of Adam in 2009. However, as of 2023, the film has not come into fruition.
