= Kiss (Dekker novel) =

2009 novel by Ted Dekker and Erin Healy

- First edition (hardback)
- Author: Ted Dekker, Erin Healy
- Language: English
- Publisher: Thomas Nelson
- Publication date: November 17, 2009
- Publication place: United States
- Media type: Print (hardback & paperback)
- Pages: 322
- ISBN: 9781595548191

Kiss is a 2009 thriller novel by Christian author Ted Dekker and Erin Healy.

== Plot summary ==
Shauna McAllister is unable to recall past events and it all started six weeks after a car accident that left her suffering a coma. She doesn’t recall anything about the accident, as well as the months leading up to the accident. Allegations surface that effect Shauna, and her father, Landon McAllister. Landon is head of McAllister MediVista, a pharmaceutical research company, and a senator who has his eyes on the White House. Shauna is aware that something stands in the way for their relationship to be reconciled. Her brother Rudy, who is her only ally, and her father's favorite, is the victim in the very accident she is being blamed for.

Shauna turns to Wayne Spade, her forgotten boyfriend, to help her piece things together to figure out the events that led up to the accident. On her journey for answers she discovers a mental ability which raises more questions. She begins to lose trust in all those around her, and it becomes clear that those around her are determined to keep her from recovering her memories.

== Critical reception ==
Belinda Elliott of The Christian Broadcasting Network describes the novel:

"Kiss moves along at a steady pace. The convincing characters pull the reader in, and the plot twists keep them turning pages to see what happens next. As with most Dekker novels, the spiritual themes are subtle. Readers will find no sermons here. But the story does offer a poignant look at the purpose of suffering and pain in our lives. Is it necessary to experience one (and live with the memories of it) in order to enjoy the other? The novel allows readers to decide."
