= Rachelle Dekker =

American author (born 1986)

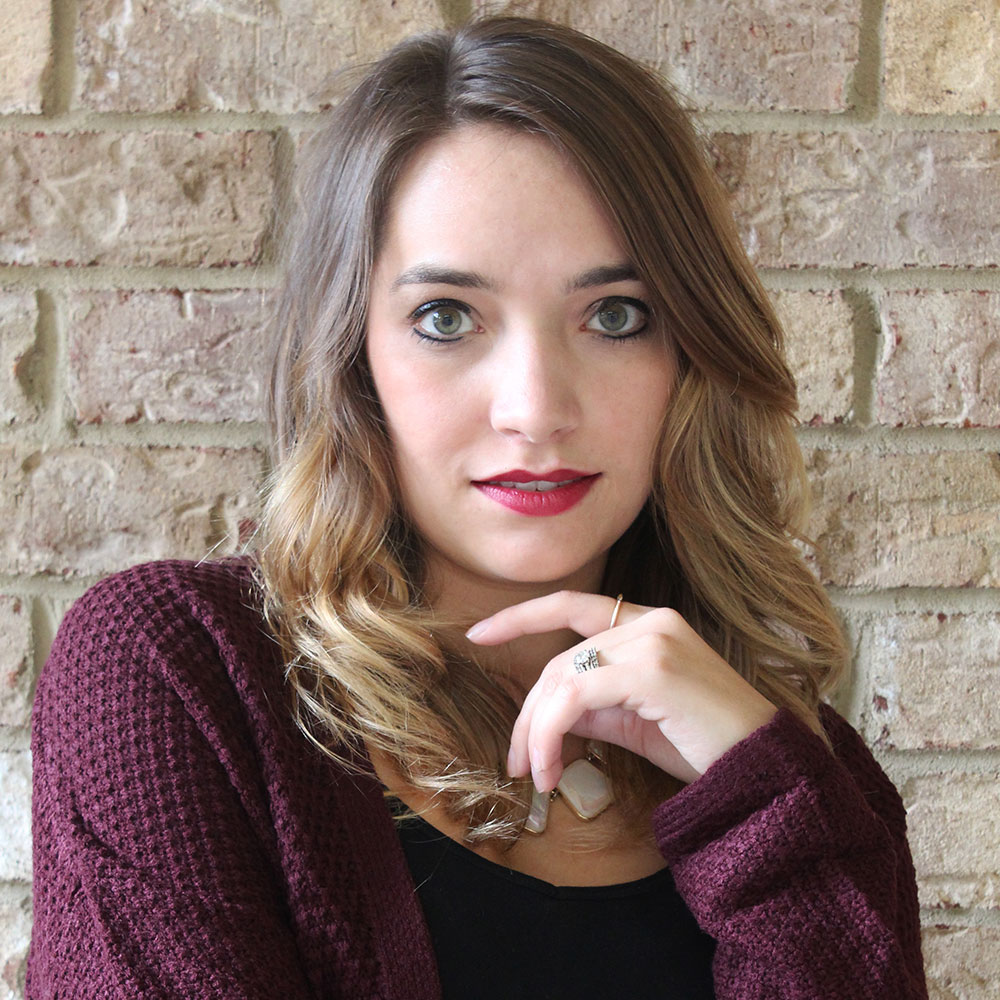
- Born: June 6, 1986 (age 40); California
- Occupation: Novelist
- Relatives: Ted Dekker (father)
- Writing career
- Genres: Fantasy, speculative fiction, science fiction, dystopian
- Notable works: The Choosing, The Calling, The Returning
- Website: www.rachelledekker.com

Rachelle Dekker (born June 6, 1986) is an American author of several novels, including the Christy Award Winning, dystopian, fantasy novel The Choosing, the first novel in The Seer Book Series. She is the eldest daughter of New York Times best-selling author, Ted Dekker.

== Biography ==
Dekker was born to author Ted Dekker and Lee Ann Dekker, and spent most of her early years in the mountains of Colorado before relocating to Tennessee where she graduated with a degree in communications and spent several years in marketing and corporate recruiting before transitioning to writing full time. Rachelle was inspired early on to discover truth through the avenue of storytelling. She writes full time from her home in Nashville, where she lives with her husband, Daniel.

Dekker's debut, The Choosing, released in May 2015, and is listed as the first book in the Seer Series. USA Today describes The Choosing as a "quest of the heart", saying "its message will resonate within any reader who has ever been made to feel 'less than.'" According to Publishers Weekly, "The strong female heroine will appeal to teen readers, and adults and teens alike may also enjoy the themes of corruption and religion, absolute human power, and government as god."

== Bibliography ==
=== Seer Series ===
1. The Choosing (May 2015)
2. The Calling (March 2016)
3. The Returning (January 2017)

=== Standalone Novels ===
1. When Through Deep Waters (July 2018)
2. The Girl Behind the Red Rope, co-written with Ted Dekker (September 2019)
3. Nine (September 2020)

=== Millie Maven Adventures ===
1. Millie Maven and The Bronze Medallion (November 2020)
2. Millie Maven and The Golden Vial (November 2020)
3. Millie Maven and The White Sword (November 2020)

== Awards and nominations ==
- 2020 Christy Award Winner in Mystery/Suspense/Thriller for The Girl Behind the Red Rope
- 2016 Christy Award Winner in Young Adult category for The Choosing
- 2016 Christy Award Finalist in First Novel category for The Choosing
- 2016 INSPYs Short List in Literature for Young Adults category for The Choosing
