= The Keeper (Dekker and Lee story) =

2011 short story by Ted Dekker and Tosca Lee

- eBook cover
- Author: Ted Dekker, Tosca Lee
- Language: English
- Series: The Book of Mortals Series
- Genre: Short Story
- Publisher: Center Street
- Publication date: September 13, 2011
- Publication place: United States
- Media type: eBook
- Followed by: Forbidden

The Keeper is a 2011 short story by Christian author Ted Dekker and Tosca Lee. It is a prequel story to the first book in the Book of Mortals Series, Forbidden. It was not put into print, but was released as an eBook.

== Plot summary ==
While in the Russian wasteland, Talus has a secret that is so terrible that it will cost him his life if he shares it. The secret is so terrible that he must share it with those who will help him protect the knowledge that will one day save all of humanity. His two brothers, who are both hermit monks, are the ones he has decided to share his secret with. Time is short, and no man could fully prepare themselves with the revelation that this secret holds, a secret Talus’ two brothers will discover: that they are already dead.
