= Undone (MercyMe album) =

Studio album by MercyMe
- Released: April 20, 2004
- Studios: Blueberry Hill, Sound Stage, Abbey Road, The Indigo Room, Maximedia, Luminous Sound, The Schwoodio
- Genres: Christian rock, pop rock
- Length: 47:38
- Label: INO
- Producer: Pete Kipley

MercyMe chronology
| Spoken For (2002) | Undone (2004) | Coming Up to Breathe (2006) |

Singles from Undone
- 1. "Here with Me" Released: 2004; 2. "Homesick" Released: 2004; 3. "In the Blink of an Eye" Released: 2005

Undone is the third studio album by Christian rock band MercyMe. It was produced by Pete Kipley and released on April 20, 2004 on INO Records. Following the success of MercyMe's previous studio efforts and their surprise crossover hit "I Can Only Imagine”, they were given significantly more resources to develop the album with. The band also brought in a sixth member, guitarist Barry Graul. Unlike the band's previous songwriting style, which was to write the lyrics first, they wrote the music for the songs on Undone before writing the lyrics. Musically, the album is a progression from the band's previous albums, adopting a guitar-driven pop rock and adult contemporary sound, while the lyrics are personal and convey Christian themes.

Undone received positive reviews from critics, with many praising the album's lyrics, mainstream appeal, and improved production value from their first two albums, although some felt the album was too similar to the band's previous works. The album won the GMA Dove Award for Pop/Contemporary Album of the Year at the 36th GMA Dove Awards. Highly anticipated before its release, Undone debuted at No. 12 on the Billboard 200 and at No. 1 on the Billboard Christian Albums chart, selling over 55,000 copies in its first week. It spent a total of two weeks atop the Christian Albums chart and ranked as one of the best-selling Christian albums of 2004 and 2005. Undone has been certified Gold by the Recording Industry Association of America (RIAA) and has sold over 627,000 copies in the United States as of April 2006. It ranked as the 38th best-selling Christian album of the 2000s in the United States.

Three singles ("Here with Me", Homesick", and "In the Blink of an Eye") were released in promotion of Undone, all of which topped at least one Christian chart format. "Here with Me" and "Homesick" also achieved success on mainstream radio, reaching the top ten on adult contemporary radio charts.

== Background and recording ==
While MercyMe was recording Undone in summer 2003, they were beginning to experience the unexpected mainstream success of "I Can Only Imagine"; although the band had been promoting their second album Spoken For (2002), "Imagine" was from their first album Almost There (2001). Because of the song's success, the band was given "substantially more resources" by their record label, INO Records, towards making Undone. One major change the band made was adding a sixth member, guitarist Barry Graul, who had previously worked with Whitecross and Jaci Velasquez. Although the band remained committed to being a Christian group and refused to change the lyrical content of their songs or approach to interviews and concerts, they did decide to make some changes; they decided to work with outside songwriters as well as to employ the London Symphony Orchestra to play strings on four tracks. They also opted to change the way they made the album; rather than writing the lyrics before the music, as they had on their previous projects, they decided to write and record all of the album's music before writing lyrics. Millard described this change in approach as the band giving him a "canvas" to write lyrics in rather than having the lyrics define the sound. MercyMe also aimed to refine their sound, identifying themselves primarily as worship leaders "trying to show worship as a lifestyle and as relevant on mainstream radio". Mike Scheuchzer, one of MercyMe's guitarists, described their musical approach as having grown "twice what we grew between Almost There and Spoken For", something the band didn't expect. Because of their success, the band was given more leeway to be creative in their musical choices. Rather than rushing a record out, the band decided to take the time to produce a record they were satisfied; Millard said that the band was "trying to be responsible enough to send [radio] something that has meaning" and didn't want to produce a "watered-down" album.

Although he did not focus less on Christian lyrical material for Undone, Millar said he did consider mainstream radio during the songwriting process. Millard attempted to write lyrics that, while still focused on God, also focused on things people deal with in their daily lives. Additionally, he avoided using Christian jargon, as he felt people who are not regular churchgoers might not understand what those terms mean. Instead, he tried to be "clearer in the things [the band] were talking about". MercyMe still felt called to be a worship band, however, and described mainstream success as "icing on the cake". An example of this is "Here with Me", the album's first single, which "puts faith front and center" but is not quite as overtly Christian as "I Can Only Imagine" was.

While working on Undone, Millard and the other members of the band, management, or friends had lost eight people close to them, culminating in the death of Millard's 20-year old brother-in-law Chris, his wife Shannon's only brother. This impacted the band's songwriting process; Millard noted that "there's a lot of personal stuff on [the album] about the things we've gone through and how Christ has been the solution". One song, "Homesick", was written after two incidents. The first incident occurred during the holiday season of 2004; a friend of Millard's had a miscarriage of twins and was so far along in the pregnancy that doctors had to induce labor. After attending their funeral, Millard wrote the chorus to the song; however, he didn't write any more to "Homesick" after that. Millar felt he "just couldn't recall what such a tragedy felt like" and decided he did not want to "fake" his way through writing the song. Following the death of his brother-in-law, Millard quickly finished the song and performed it at his funeral. Although Undone was "essentially complete" at that point, the band recorded the song and included it on the album. The final song to be written for the album was "Keep Singing", which was recorded at 4 a.m. on the album's final night of recording.

MercyMe had decided the album would be called Undone before any of the lyrics were written. The title was inspired by "the unexpected twists and turns in the band's journey". Millard commented that "we had our plans for what we were going to do; but when the bigger picture happened, all of our plans came unraveled. We don't know what tomorrow will hold. When you make your own plans, you suddenly find yourself undone; and that's exactly where God wants us in the first place". Robby Shaffer, the band's drummer, said that the title also applied to its musical approach. He said that "[Undone] is very different for us as far as music goes. It challenged us, it pushed us and I think it ultimately made us better musicians".

Undone was produced by Pete Kipley and was recorded by F. Reid Shippen, Mike O' Connor, and Steve Bishir; recording took place at Blueberry Hill, Sound Stage, Abbey Road, The Indigo Room, Maximedia, Luminous Sound, and The Schwoodio. Mixing was conducted by F. Reid Shippen and Lee Bridges, while mastering was done by Ted Jensen at Sterling Sound. The string tracks on "Homesick", "Where You Lead Me", "Unaware", and "Here with Me" were arranged by Rob Mathes and recorded by Simon Rhodes and Andrew Dudman at Abbey Road. The cello on "Keep Singing" was performed by Matt Slocum.

== Composition ==
=== Lyrics ===
Here with Me
"Here with Me", which was released as the first single from Undone, is a mid-tempo song. Its musical style received comparisons to Coldplay.

Homesick
"Homesick", a ballad, focuses on "persevering on earth in anticipation of heaven".

In the Blink of an Eye
"In the Blink of an Eye" is one of the more up-tempo songs on Undone with a lyrical focus on the relationship between faith and earthy esponsibilities.

According to Millard, "themes of the album cover that Christ loves even when we don't deserve it and the hope of never being alone". Millard felt these themes, while simple, "mean the world to people who have never heard them". Lyrically, Undone has been noted as having 'personal' lyrics. The lyrics deal with Christian themes and there is an "abundance" of "spiritually vertical" content. The album was also noted as taking a more mature lyrical approach than their previous albums. "Here with Me" focuses on the theme of God's love and omnipotence, while "Homesick" focuses on "persevering on earth in anticipation of heaven", with Millard asking, "Lord won't you give me strength to make it through somehow?". The title track describes humanity's "never-ending quest for self-improvement"; Shaffer explained that “we're undone from our freedom side of it, or you could say we're undone as far as we're not quite to where we're going yet. We're constantly striving to get where God wants us. I don't think that we'll ever become 'done' until we're in heaven". "Unaware" and "Caught Up in the Middle" are about making everything in life secondary to God while "Keep Singing" is about "pressing on and praising God in light of tragedy". "Shine On" ponders "how can we light the way/If we don't go to them". "In the Blink of an Eye" features Millard questioning, "How can I further Your kingdom/When I'm so wrapped up in mine?".

=== Music ===
Musically, the band regarded Undone as a new progression from their previous work. Bassist Nathan Cochran said that "it's not a sharp left turn; it's a step beyond what we've ever done. We feel like our message and calling are the same... We're still worship leaders; we're just on a different scale". The album was noted as having a higher production budget than the band's first two albums, resulting in a more refined sound, while the addition of Graul as a secondary guitarist allowed for more textured guitar work. As a whole, Undone is edgier and more rock-oriented than the band's previous albums. The album is guitar-driven with a pop rock and adult contemporary sound. It maintains the band's style from their previous albums, with elements like string instruments and influences from Britpop. The album's string arrangements were compared to those of the alternative rock band Coldplay. The opening track, "Where You Lead Me", builds from an acoustic guitar-driven opening into a crescendo featuring synthesizers and guitars. Everything Impossible" adopts a similar musical style, but has a more "propulsive" beat and an instrumental break driven by power chords. "Here with Me" has a musical style similar to Coldplay. "Homesick" is a ballad and features strings from the London Symphony Orchestra. More upbeat cuts on the album include "In the Blink of an Eye", "Caught Up In The Middle", and "A Million Miles Away", while "Keep Singing" only features piano and vocals. The album's title track was described as "atmospheric" and "full of quiet resignation".

== Release and commercial performance ==
Undone was highly anticipated. In promotion of the album, "Here with Me" was released to both Christian and mainstream radio. It marked the first single the band had released since "I Can Only Imagine" had become successful on mainstream radio in 2003. Like with "I Can Only Imagine", Curb Records was responsible for the promotion of "Here with Me" to mainstream radio. The song was regarded as a safer choice for mainstream radio, as it was not quite as explicit in its religious themes as "I Can Only Imagine". By the time Undone released, the song had broken into the top ten on the Billboard Christian Songs chart and ranked on the Billboard Adult Contemporary chart.

Undone sold 55,000 copies in the United States in its first week, MercyMe's highest sales week at that point. The strong performance of "Here with Me" was noted a reason for the album's strong sales numbers. It debuted at No. 12 on the Billboard 200 and at No. 1 on the Billboard Christian Albums chart, their second career No. 1 album on that chart. The album spent a total of two weeks atop the Christian Albums chart. "Here with Me" ultimately spent 13 weeks at No. 1 on the Billboard Christian Songs chart and 10 weeks at No. 1 on the Billboard Christian AC chart. It also peaked at No. 1 on the Radio & Records INSPO chart, No. 2 on the Radio & Records Christian CHR chart, No. 10 on the Radio & Records Adult Contemporary chart, No. 12 on the Billboard Adult Contemporary chart, and No. 38 on the Billboard Adult Top 40 chart. The album's second single, "Homesick", also achieved success at Christian and mainstream radio, peaking at No. 1 on the INSPO chart, No. 3 on the Christian Songs and Christian AC charts, and No. 9 on the Billboard Adult Contemporary chart. The final single from Undone, "In the Blink of an Eye", spent five weeks at No. 1 on the Christian Songs chart and six weeks at No. 1 on the Christian AC chart.

According to Billboard, Undone ranked as the fifth best-selling Christian album of 2004 and fourteenth best-selling Christian album of 2005. It ranked as the thirty-eighth best-selling Christian album of the 2000s in the United States and has sold over 627,000 copies in the United States as of April 2006.

== Critical reception ==
Professional ratings
Review scores
| Source | Rating |
|---|---|
| About.com | 5/5 stars |
| AllMusic | 3/5 stars |
| CCM Magazine | A |
| Christianity Today | 3/5 stars |
| Cross Rhythms | 9/10 squares |
| Jesus Freak Hideout | 3/5 stars |

Undone received mostly positive reviews from music critics. Although some critics felt the songwriting and music were too similar to the band's previous efforts, others praised the album's 'personal' style. Kim Jones of About.com gave the album five out of five stars, saying that "[the album] has been called by many people as one of the best new releases of 2004 and I have to agree". Johnny Loftus of Allmusic gave it three out of five stars, saying that "With its slick production and MercyMe's full lineup of guitars, percussion, and keys, [Undone] suggests the tangent of Nashville contemporary country that favors straightforward pop melody over any sort of hard twang. Likewise, the album's more upbeat moments reflect the trend in secular adult alternative toward earnest vocals over whitewashed rock (à la Vertical Horizon). Both sounds work well for MercyMe on Undone, doubtless giving fans of the band's music and devotion plenty more to believe in". David McCreary of CCM Magazine gave Undone an A, calling it "[MercyMe's] most mature, personal recording to date", also praising Bart Millard's vocals as well as the album's production value. Tony Cummings of Cross Rhythms gave the album nine out of ten stars, calling it a "huge improvement" over Spoken For (2002), specifically complimenting the album's lyrics and production value. Deborah Evans Price of Billboard called the album "an impressive collection filled with great songs and solid performances". She praised Millard's vocals and the album's lyrics and production, said it should appeal to both Christian and mainstream listeners, and called MercyMe a band "too good to be limited to one genre". Jenny Williams of Entertainment Weekly praised the album's appeal to mainstream listeners, saying it "carefully balances unabashedly holy sentiments with lyrics that could be alluding to a new love just as easily as to God" while praising its songwriting and "Coldplay-inspired string arrangements".

While calling Undone MercyMe's "most satisfying" record to date, Russ Breimeier of Christianity Today regarded the songwriting as "monotonous" and felt that MercyMe was "beginning to sound like they're repeating themselves". Josh Taylor of Jesus Freak Hideout gave the album three out of five stars, opining that "Frankly, this is the same stuff they were doing three years and two albums ago... If you're a diehard MercyMe fan, this disc will be music to your ears. But for those of us who long for change (Not drastic ones, mind you. But small, significant ones.), Undone seems redundant. It's still good, but it's beginning to become stale".

At the 36th GMA Dove Awards, Undone won the award for Pop/Contemporary Album of the Year.

== Track listing ==
All tracks are written by Jim Bryson, Nathan Cochran, Barry Graul, Pete Kipley, Bart Millard, Mike Scheuchzer and Robby Shaffer except where noted.

Album release
| No. | Title | Writer(s) | Length |
|---|---|---|---|
| 1. | "Where You Lead Me" | | 3:37 |
| 2. | "Everything Impossible" | | 3:35 |
| 3. | "Here with Me" | Jim Bryson, Nathan Cochran, Pete Kipley, Bart Millard, Dan Muckala, Brad Russell, Mike Scheuchzer, Robby Shaffer | 4:09 |
| 4. | "In the Blink of an Eye" | | 3:16 |
| 5. | "Unaware" | | 4:08 |
| 6. | "Homesick" | Millard | 3:41 |
| 7. | "When You Spoke My Name" | Bryson, Cochran, Graul, Joel Hanson, Kipley, Millard, Scheuchzer, Shaffer | 3:37 |
| 8. | "A Million Miles Away" | | 3:22 |
| 9. | "Caught Up In the Middle" | | 3:24 |
| 10. | "Never Alone" | | 3:37 |
| 11. | "Undone" | | 4:21 |
| 12. | "Shine On" | | 4:00 |
| 13. | "Keep Singing" | Graul, Kipley, Millard | 2:51 |
| Total length: | | | 47:38 |

== Personnel ==
Credits adapted from the album liner notes.

MercyMe

- Bart Millard – vocals
- Jim Bryson – pianos, Hammond B3 organ, synthesizers
- Mike Scheuchzer – guitars
- Barry Graul – guitars
- Nathan Cochran – bass
- Robby Shaffer – drums

Additional performers

- Matt Slocum – cello
- Rob Mathes – string arrangements

Production and technical

- Pete Kipley – producer
- Steve Bishir – recording
- Mike "X" O'Connor – recording
- F. Reid Shippen – recording, mixing
- Simon Rhodes – string recording
- Andrew Dudman – string recording assistant
- Lee Bridges – mixing
- Ted Jensen – mastering at Sterling Sound, New York City

Design

- Dana Salsedo – creative design
- Harding Design – art direction, design
- Tony Baker – photography
- Kerri Stuart – wardrobe
- Robin Geary – grooming

== Charts and certifications ==
Weekly album charts
| Chart (2004) | Peak position |
|---|---|
| US Billboard 200 | 12 |
| US Christian Albums (Billboard) | 1 |

Weekly single charts
| Year | Song | Peak chart positions | | | |
| Year | Song | US Christ | Christ AC | Christ CHR | US AC |
|---|---|---|---|---|---|
| 2004 | "Here with Me" | 1 | 1 | 2 | 12 |
| 2004 | "Homesick" | 3 | 3 | 27 | 9 |
| 2005 | "In the Blink of an Eye" | 1 | 1 | 16 | — |

Year-end charts
| Chart (2004) | Peak position |
|---|---|
| US Christian Albums (Billboard) | 5 |
| Chart (2005) | Peak position |
| US Christian Albums (Billboard) | 14 |

Decade-end album charts
| Chart (2000s) | Peak position |
|---|---|
| US Christian Albums (Billboard) | 38 |

Certifications
| Country | Certification | Units shipped |
|---|---|---|
| United States | Gold | 500,000 |

== Release history ==
| Region | Date | Label |
|---|---|---|
| United States | April 20, 2004 | INO Records |
| United States | March 29, 2005 (DualDisc) | INO/Epic |
