= Skin (Dekker novel) =

2007 novel by Ted Dekker

- Cover Art
- Author: Ted Dekker
- Language: English
- Genre: Christian Fiction
- Publisher: Thomas Nelson
- Publication date: April 3, 2007
- Publication place: United States of America
- Media type: Hardcover and Paperback
- Pages: 395 (Hardcover)
- ISBN: 1-59554-277-9 (Hardcover)
- OCLC: 71842712
- Dewey Decimal: 813/.6 22
- LC Class: PS3554.E43 S57 2007

Skin is a contemporary Christian fiction science fiction/horror novel released in April 2007 by Ted Dekker. Dekker's novel, Skin was published by Thomas Nelson with the purpose to connect the Circle Trilogy, the Project Showdown books, and an upcoming series of books.

== Plot ==
When three freak tornados hit the fictional, isolated town of Summervile in rural Nevada, the entire town is carried off by the storm, and five survivors find themselves at the mercy of a more ominous threat - a serial killer by the name of Sterling Red, who orders them to kill the ugliest of the group. As they struggle with determining what true beauty is, the FBI scrambles to determine Red's true identity and stop him. But they must hurry, because Red has promised that if his insane demands are not met in six hours, he'll begin his killing spree again.

== Main characters ==
- Wendy Davidson: A cult survivor who has a fear of men from experiences with the cult leader.
- Colt Jackson: A cop in the small town of Summerville. Grew up in a prostitution house and was abandoned by his mother.
- Jerry Pinkus: A professional gamer who had frontal lobe epilepsy.
- Nicole Swartz: A seemingly innocent beauty with a hidden past.
- Carey Swartz: Nicole's brother who is involved with the occult.
- Sterling Red: A vindictive killer with a mysterious identity.
