= Obsessed (novel) =

2005 novel by Ted Dekker

- Hardcover edition
- Author: Ted Dekker
- Language: English
- Genre: Novel
- Publisher: WestBow Press (USA)
- Publication date: 2005
- Publication place: United States
- Media type: Print (Hardback & Paperback)
- ISBN: 1-59554-311-2 (mass market paperback) ISBN 0-8499-4373-6 (hard cover edition) ISBN 1-59554-078-4 (paperback edition)
- OCLC: 76837072

Obsessed is a 2005 thriller novel by Christian author Ted Dekker.

== Plot summary ==
Obsessed tells a story of Stephen Friedman—a successful realtor, a Jewish immigrant, and an orphan who had tried to find out who his parents were for a long time and at last gave up. An unexpected letter from a friend and a newspaper article offer help: Stephen discovers that his mother was Rachel Spritzer, a woman who had been through the nightmare of World War II concentration camps, and recently died. Stephen also learns that she was quite wealthy and had some property, including a priceless historical artifact—a stone of David, one of the five stones believed to be used by David to defeat the giant Goliath. Also, it may be that she knew where the other four stones are.

Stephen becomes obsessed with the idea to find the remaining stones. He heads to his mother's old house, where he believes the clues are hidden. However, the house is bought by someone else, snatched right out of Stephen's hands. The new owner is Roth Braun, a German, the son of Gerhard Braun who was the Nazi Commandant of the concentration camp, Torùn. Roth Braun knows about the stones and about Stephen's plans. And he also has plans of his own.

The story goes on as Stephen makes one desperate attempt to get into his mother's house after another. Braun's thugs do their best to keep him away. Another storyline takes us back in time to the World War II camp, telling about two pregnant women, Ruth and Martha (Stephen's mother) and their struggles with the ruthless commandant who kills on a whim and plays games with the prisoners by giving and taking away their hope. There is some mystery here, and, although the two storylines seem unconnected, they eventually come together.

== Printing Error ==
In an unknown number of copies of the mass market edition of Obsessed, two pages containing pgs. 283-284 and 285-286 were swapped.

== Critical reception ==
Carrie Plucker of The Daily Evergreen describes the novel as "an engrossing, fast-paced novel that gives the reader exactly what it advertises: an obsession."
