= Infidel (novel) =

2007 novel by Ted Dekker

- The Cover for Infidel
- Author: Ted Dekker
- Cover artist: Tim Green
- Language: English
- Series: The Lost Books
- Genre: Young adult, Fantasy
- Published: 2007 (Thomas Nelson)
- Publication place: United States

Infidel was written by Christian author Ted Dekker and was released on December 15, 2007. It is the second young adult novel in The Lost Book series. These new novels span the fifteen-year period that is gapped in the Circle Trilogy's Black and Red. Thomas Hunter is still the commander of the Forest Guard when these stories occur.

== Synopsis ==
Stretched to their limits and celebrated as heroes, the chosen will wish they had never been given that thankless task of finding the seven lost Books of History before the Dark One can. Martyn, a new Horde general, emerges and lures Johnis into the Horde city, Thrall, to force him into betraying Thomas. Once there, the chosen four are all caught by the Horde and Johnis is forced to strand Thomas into the desert to die. In the end, Johnis, Silvie, Billos, and Darsal are able to save Johnis' mother, retrieve three of the Lost books of History, and recruit the Dark Priest of Teelah's daughter into becoming a member of the forest.

== Printing error ==
An unknown amount of the original copies of Infidel feature Chosen's map. The back side map has the "Black Forest" written as "Unknown". The bottom left features an eye, as on the cover of Chosen, rather than the typical curled hand, as on the cover of Infidel.
