= Immanuel's Veins =

2010 novel by Ted Dekker

First edition (publ. Thomas Nelson)

Immanuel's Veins is a Christian novel by Ted Dekker that was published in America on September 7, 2010. It follows the life, love, and death of Saint Thomas the Beast Hunter of Russia. (Thomas is mentioned briefly, twice, in Dekker's book Green) It is the first novel Dekker has published that is written in the first person.

== Plot ==
In 1772, the Cantemir family is placed in the safe-keeping of Toma Nicolescu by Catherine the Great. He soon falls in love with Lucine Cantemir, the daughter of the family he is sworn to protect. Although, the fact of his love is kept secret from even her, for he is faithful to his duty. But then, Vlad van Valerik (Vlad is the same Vlad 'Smith' that is Shadow Man in the 49th Mystic who is also known as Black in Showdown) comes onto the scene and starts courting Lucine, and Toma is alerted by this, whether it be in a sense of danger, or out of jealousy.

== Publication ==
In the Netherlands, Immanuel's Veins was not published because it was deemed by the Dutch publisher to be 'too sensual'. Dekker defended his novel by saying it was no more sensual than the Song of Solomon in the Bible. His American publisher, Thomas Nelson, saw no reason not to publish the novel, and it was released in America on schedule.
