= Blink (novel) =

Novel by Ted Dekker

- First edition cover.
- Author: Ted Dekker
- Language: English
- Genre: Novel
- Publisher: Thomas Nelson
- Publication date: January 2003
- Publication place: United States
- Media type: Book (hardcover, paperback)
- Pages: 400
- ISBN: 1-59554-043-1
- OCLC: 60825909

Blink is a 2003 novel by Christian author Ted Dekker. It was re-released in November 2007 under the title Blink of an Eye, featuring new content and a more expedient storyline. It follows two main characters from a 3rd person perspective. Blink is set in the modern-day United States and in the Middle East, and features a Christian fiction perspective.

== Plot summary ==
Protagonist Seth Border is a college student who has one of the world's highest IQs. One day he begins developing a tremendous skill: the ability to see multiple possible futures. This ability first manifests itself for a few seconds at a time, and gradually exponentiates into an ability to see millions of possibilities that could happen hours and days later. Little does Seth know that when he is thrown together with a Saudi princess, Miriam Al-Asamm, who flees her country to escape oppression, he will soon have the adventure of his life as they explore the truth about Christianity and Seth's gift of precognition while running for their lives.

== Link to Christianity ==
The initial reference to Christianity in the novel occurs near the beginning, when Seth proves to his professor that God does not exist by using logic. Controversy emerges when Seth comes to believe that his visions of multiple possibilities prove there is no all-knowing God. Throughout the story, Seth struggles with the truth of God's existence and eventually finds that because God exists outside of time, there can logically be multiple futures.

== Sequel ==
Dekker once stated that a sequel was brewing, but in February 2010, Erin Healy, Ted's editor and co-author, mentioned that the book has been put on hold. In 2011, Healy stated in a fan interview that the probability of a sequel ever being finished is slim to none.
