= In the Blink of an Eye (song) =

Single by MercyMe

from the album Undone
- Released: July 2005
- Recorded: 2004
- Genre: CCM; pop rock
- Length: 3:16
- Label: INO/Curb
- Songwriters: James Bryson, Nathan Cochran, Barry Graul, Bart Millard, Michael John Scheuchzer, Robin Shaffer, Pete Kipley
- Producer: Pete Kipley

MercyMe singles chronology
"Homesick" (2004)	"In the Blink of an Eye" (2005)	"So Long Self" (2006)

"In the Blink of an Eye" is a song written and performed by Christian rock band, MercyMe. It is the third and final radio single released in promotion of MercyMe's 2004 studio album, Undone.

== Composition ==
In the Blink of an Eye
"In the Blink of an Eye" is one of the more up-tempo songs on Undone with a lyrical focus on the relationship between faith and earthy esponsibilities.

"In The Blink of an Eye" is a Christian rock song with a length of three minutes and sixteen seconds. The song is set in the key of D major and has a tempo of 116 beats per minute, with a vocal range spanning from G_{3}-E♭_{5}.

== Track listing ==
1. "In The Blink Of An Eye" – 3:16 (Peter Kipley, MercyMe)

== Charts ==
Chart (2004–2005)	Peak Position
U.S. Billboard Hot Christian Songs	1
U.S. Billboard Hot Christian AC	1
U.S. R&R Christian AC Indicator	1
U.S. R&R Christian AC	1
U.S. R&R Christian CHR	16

Chart (2000s)	Position
Billboard Hot Christian Songs	48
