= The Priest's Graveyard =

2011 book by Ted Dekker

- First edition (publ. Center Street)
- Author: Ted Dekker
- Language: English
- Publisher: Center Street
- Publication date: 2011
- Publication place: United States
- LC Class: PS3554.E43 P75

The Priest's Graveyard is a thriller novel by Ted Dekker, published in April 2011.

== Synopsis ==
Renee Gilmore is a former heroin addict, living with her lover Lamont Myers in a glass house, by the sea in Malibu. They live a nearly perfect life, until Lamont disappears one day. Lamont had recently told Renee about a shady character named Jonathan Bourque. Renee concludes that Bourque must have killed Lamont, and decides to find and kill him.

Meanwhile, a Bosnian immigrant priest named Danny Hansen kills the guilty who have escaped justice. Danny Hansen kills a man named Cain Kellerman, but before he murders him, the man repeatedly insists that he must have been hired by Jonathan Bourque. This sends Hansen after Jonathan Bourque.

Renee and Hansen cross paths repeatedly as they pursue their revenge. They begin to fall in love, but secrets and betrayals may keep them apart.

== Sequel ==
In 2011, Dekker announced that he was starting another thriller, stating that it had to be first person female. Later, he announced it would be titled The Apprentice, but it was then changed to Meltdown. Sometime later in the year, an official title was set: The Sanctuary. After this, Dekker said that the book would be a continuation of his novel The Priest's Graveyard which was released in April of that year. Danny Hansen and Renee Gilmore—the two main characters of TPG—will be returning. The synopsis tells readers that Danny is now in prison, serving a fifty-year prison sentence for the murder of two abusive men. He commits to a code of non-violence, maneuvering deftly within a ruthless prison system. Then, the woman he loves, Renee, receives a box containing a bloody finger and draconian demands. Now, Danny must find a way to escape the prison. If Danny fails, Renee will die; and if Renee fails, Danny will die. And the body count will not stop at two. In an interview with a popular reviewing site, Dekker mentioned that The Sanctuary was, in some way, returning to his old style when it came to spiritual elements. The Sanctuary was released October 30, 2012.
