= The Bride Collector =

2010 novel by Ted Dekker

First edition

The Bride Collector is a 2010, thriller, and suspense novel written by Ted Dekker and published by Center Street. This marked Ted Dekker's eighth thriller novel.

== Plot summary ==
FBI Special agent Brad Raines is facing his toughest case yet. A Denver serial killer has killed four beautiful young women and leaves a bridal veil at each crime scene. Unable to crack the case, Raines appeals for help from a most unusual source: residents of the Center for Wellness and Intelligence, a private psychiatric institution for mentally ill individuals who have extraordinary gifts. It's there that he meets Paradise. Diagnosed with schizophrenia, Paradise may also have an extrasensory gift: the ability to experience the final moments of a person's life when she touches the dead body. In a desperate attempt to find the killer, Raines enlists Paradise's help. In an effort to win her trust, he befriends this strange young woman and begins to see in her qualities that most 'sane people' sorely lack. Gradually, he starts to question whether sanity resides outside the hospital walls...or inside. As the Bride Collector picks up the pace-and volume-of his gruesome crucifixions, the case becomes even more personal to Raines when his friend and colleague, a beautiful young forensic psychologist, becomes the Bride Collector's next target. The FBI believes that the killer plans to murder seven women. Paradise may be the key to help solve the case with Brad before it's too late. The Bride Collector will haunt the reader with a new way of looking at beauty, love, and the world in which we live.

== Reviews ==
Examiner.com says: "Absolutely the best beach read of the summer, the best late night read of the fall."

It holds a #43 spot in the NPR's top fifty thrillers of all time.
