= Mortal (novel) =

2013 novel by Ted Dekker and Tosca Lee

- First edition
- Author: Ted Dekker & Tosca Lee
- Language: English
- Series: Book of Mortals
- Genre: Christian Fiction
- Published: 02-2013 (FaithWords)
- Publication place: United States
- Media type: Print
- Pages: 496
- Preceded by: Forbidden
- Followed by: Sovereign

Mortal is a science fiction fantasy novel by Ted Dekker and Tosca Lee, published in February 2013. It is the second book in a trilogy.

== Plot ==
Nine years have passed since hero Rom Sebastian first stumbled upon a secret vial of blood capable of bringing himself back to life. He has survived impossible odds, and has created a secret faction of followers who have also taken the blood, the first Mortals in a dead world. The Order has built an elite army in which to hunt down and crush the living. Division and betrayal pose a threat to the Mortals from within. Jonathan is the only one who has the true life blood flowing through him, and he can save all humanity. Jonathan is waiting to step up to the throne on his 18th birthday. Saric develops the Dark Bloods, and revives his sister Feyn. She will reign and treat her brother as her Maker. When Jonathan tries to heal a Dark Blood, it begins to deteriorate his purity. The only hope for surviving is on the edge of collapse, and no one is certain of the path to survival.
