= Forbidden (Dekker and Lee novel) =

2011 novel by Ted Dekker and Tosca Lee

- First edition
- Author: Ted Dekker & Tosca Lee
- Language: English
- Series: Book of Mortals
- Genre: Christian Fiction
- Published: 09-2011 (FaithWords)
- Publication place: United States
- Media type: Print
- Pages: 448
- ISBN: 9781599953557
- Preceded by: The Keeper (short story prequel)
- Followed by: Mortal

Forbidden is a science fiction fantasy novel by Ted Dekker and Tosca Lee, published in September 2011. It is the first book in a trilogy, and was followed by the novels Mortal in June 2012 and Sovereign in June 2013. A prequel, titled The Keeper was also published in 2011.

== Plot ==
Fearing for his life, Rom is on the run and stumbles across a vial of blood and a cryptic message.

Meanwhile, the ruler of the world Saric, in the city Byzantium, is curious about emotion. Years before, Megas, the founder of the Order, has unleashed a genetic virus that suppressed emotion. Saric wanted to experience it firsthand.

Rom goes home, only to discover guards killing his mother. He runs to his friend Avra's house to drink a mouth full of the blood. It knocks him out. When he wakes up, he discovered Avra had drunk it as well and asleep. He feels that he has been granted emotion. They enlist two other friends who have potential.

Rom looks at the vellum that enclosed the vial but is unable to decipher it. He and the four kidnaps the only person known who can decipher it: Feyn, the sovereign's sister. She helps them discover that a scientist used his blood's immunity to pass the blood down. The scientist in his writing said that a boy in year 471 will be born with full emotion and be the savior of the human race.

They find the boy Jonathan in Africa and take him. Jonathan, at nine years old, is made Sovereign, but grants regency to the Senate. Rom takes the boy to find supporters.

== Major characters ==
- Rom : Receives an ancient vial of blood with a piece of cryptic writing. In fear of his life, he drinks a portion of the vial revealing new emotions of love never experienced before. The blood resurrects hatred, ambition, and greed that come at a terrible risk. After he discovers this new life he must risk everything to find a way to bring life to the rest of the world.
- Avra : Best friends of Rom, she goes to his aid when Rom finds that he is in trouble. After Rom drinks a portion of the blood, she drinks another portion of the blood. She discovers the same love for Rom that he discovered of her. She helps Rom on his quest.
- Feyn : The soon to be Sovereign of the world and the sister of Saric. She is the closest to one of three eligible birth cycles during the reign of the current Sovereign.
- Saric : The son of the current Sovereign who experiments with a concoction to bring back emotions that were lost. He is in search of the vial of blood that Rom holds. He will stop at nothing to get the vial so that he can perfect his recipe.
- Jonathan : The boy who is in hiding due to his disfigurement and is the true Sovereign to be of the world. His blood will bring life back to the world.
- Vorrin : The current Sovereign who is five days from his term, where he will pass his reign to his daughter Feyn.
- Triphon : A Citadel Guard who is in training and long time friends of Rom, takes a portion of the vial to see if what Rom tells him is true. He discovers the secrets of the vial and helps Rom in his quest.
- Neah : A long time friend of Rom who strictly follows the Order, is forced to take a portion of the vial. She helps Rom, Avra, and Triphon on their quest.
