= Tosca Lee =

American author (born 1969)

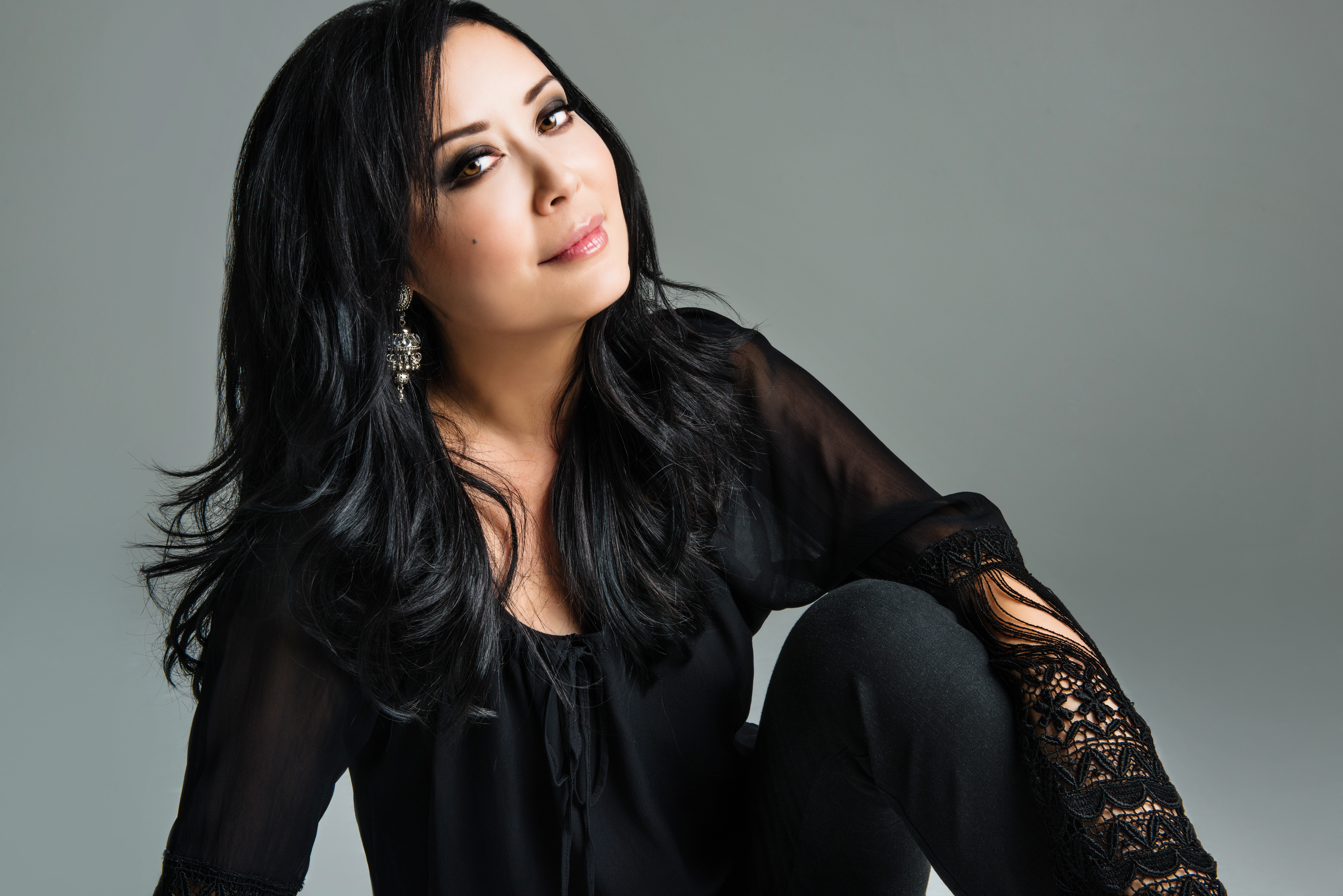
- Born: December 1, 1969 (age 56); Roanoke, Virginia, U.S.
- Education: Smith College (BA); University of Oxford
- Occupation: Author
- Website: www.toscalee.com

Tosca Lee (born December 1, 1969) is an American author known for her historical novels and thrillers.

== Biography ==
Lee was born in Roanoke, Virginia, United States to a Korean father and a Euro-American mother. Her father, Professor Emeritus Sang Moon Lee, who had early aspirations of an opera career, named Tosca after his favorite Puccini opera.

As a young classically trained ballerina and pianist, Lee pursued an early career in dance until injuries derailed hopes of a successful career.

Lee received her BA from Smith College in Northampton, Massachusetts in English language and literature. She also studied international economics at Oxford University. While at Smith, Lee wrote her first novel—a story of the Stonehenge people of Salisbury plain (unpublished).

She began writing professionally in 1992 for Smart Computing Magazine, during which time she co-authored two computer books. In the 1990s, Lee held two pageant titles, Mrs. Nebraska America 1996 and Mrs. Nebraska United States 1998, and placed first runner-up to Mrs. United States. For her philanthropic work and advocacy of health, women's, children's, ethnic, and cultural groups, she was awarded an admiralship of the Great Navy of the State of Nebraska by then-governor Ben Nelson. During this time, she wrote as a freelancer and penned the majority of her second novel (unpublished).

After setting the pageant world aside, she went to work in 2003 for the Gallup Organization as a senior consultant to Fortune 500 companies.

== Career ==
Lee penned the novel that would become Demon: A Memoir around 2000. It sold in 2006 in a multi-book deal after nearly six years of rejection. Once published, it garnered critical acclaim, including a Christy Award nomination.

Lee wrote her next novel, Havah: The Story of Eve, while traveling internationally as a consultant for the Gallup Organization. Havah received a starred review from Publishers Weekly and 4.5 stars from Romantic Times. The two books weren't without controversy from conservative readers – Demon for its darkly spiritual subject matter and Havah for its sensuality in the portrayal of Eve's relationship with Adam.

In 2010, Lee left her position with Gallup and signed on to write the post-apocalyptic Books of Mortals series with New York Times bestseller, Ted Dekker. Forbidden, the first novel in the series, debuted on the New York Times Bestseller list in September 2011, as did the second installment, Mortal, in June 2012. Sovereign, the conclusion to the series, released in June 2013 and became a bestseller in the Christian market.

Iscariot, Lee's novel about Judas, the disciple and infamous betrayer of Christ, was released in February 2013 after three publisher changes, three years of research and writing, and a five-year lull after the release of her last solo novel, Havah. Iscariot became a bestseller in the Christian market where it also garnered starred reviews. Publishers Weekly praised Iscariot as "mind-bending Biblical fiction that dares to put readers in the mind of the most infamous character of Christian history" calling Lee's research and writing "impeccable and masterful". In 2014, Iscariot won the Christian Book of the Year in fiction. It was also named a Best in Christian Fiction Title of 2013 by the Library Journal.

Lee's novel about The Queen of Sheba, The Legend of Sheba: Rise of a Queen, was released in September 2014 to starred reviews. It was named a Best of Christian Fiction selection by the Library Journal and also became a bestseller. In 2015, it was finalized for the 2015 Christian Book Award for fiction, won by Lee's Iscariot the year before.

In 2015, Lee turned her attention to new adult thrillers but continued her study of historically significant, maligned characters in her House of Bathory duology (The Progeny, Firstborn) – a pair of supernatural suspense thrillers centered around the fictional descendants of the "Blood Countess" Elizabeth Báthory. In 2016 The Progeny landed on the IndieBound bestseller list. In 2018, Firstborn won Ream Makers' paranormal book award as well as Book of the Year. As of 2017, the duology was in development for TV by Radar Pictures and Ed Burns' Marlboro Road Gang Productions. In November 2018 Deadline Hollywood announced the CW Network had bought the series, with CBS TV Studios joining production and Orphan Black's Chris Roberts attached to show run and write.

The Line Between, Lee's apocalyptic thriller about a young woman ousted from an Iowa doomsday cult as a pandemic breaks out across the United States, entered development for TV by Radar Pictures and Marlboro Road Gang Productions prior to its release, as reported by Deadline Hollywood. The book debuted in January 2019 as Amazon's #1 medical thriller, won a silver Literary Titan award in September 2019, and was a Goodreads Choice Awards semifinalist for best mystery/thriller of 2019. The sequel, A Single Light, was released on September 17, 2019.

== Personal life ==
Lee lives with her husband, Bryan, and three of her four stepchildren are still at home.

== Bibliography ==
In addition to English, Lee's novels have been published in Dutch, Portuguese, Indonesian, Spanish, Korean, Slovak, Turkish, Estonian, Hebrew, Russian, Bulgarian, German, Italian, Polish, Hungarian, Romanian, and Croatian.

- Demon: A Memoir, 2007, NavPress
- Havah: The Story of Eve, 2008, NavPress
- Iscariot: A Novel of Judas, February 2013, Simon & Schuster
- Ismeni, August 2014, Simon & Schuster
- The Legend of Sheba: Rise of a Queen, September 2014, Simon & Schuster
- The Progeny, May 2016, Simon & Schuster
- Firstborn, May 2017, Simon & Schuster
- The Line Between, January 2019, Simon & Schuster
- A Single Light, September 17, 2019, Simon & Schuster

=== The Books of Mortals ===
with Ted Dekker:

- The Keeper, September 2011, Hachette Book Group
- Forbidden, September 2011, Hachette Book Group
- Mortal, June 2012, Hachette Book Group
- Sovereign, June 2013, Hachette Book Group

== Awards and recognition ==
- 2008 Christy Award Finalist (Demon: A Memoir)
- 2008 ForeWord Magazine Book of the Year Silver Award Winner (Demon: A Memoir)
- 2009 ForeWord Magazine Book of the Year Bronze Award Winner (Havah: The Story of Eve)
- 2011 ECPA Bestseller List (Forbidden)
- 2011 NY Times Bestseller List, Hardcover Fiction, #17 (Forbidden)
- 2012 Christian Retailers Retailer's Choice Award (Forbidden)
- 2012 ECPA Bestseller List (Forbidden, Mortal)
- 2012 CBA Bestseller List (Mortal)
- 2012 New York Times Bestseller List, Hardcover Fiction (Mortal)
- 2012 Christy Award Finalist (Forbidden)
- 2012 New York Times Bestseller List, eBook (Forbidden)
- 2013 A Library Journal Best Christian Fiction Title of 2013 (Iscariot)
- 2013 ECPA Bestseller List (Sovereign)
- 2013 CBA Bestseller List (Sovereign)
- 2013 CBA Bestseller List (Iscariot)
- 2014 Library Journal Best of 2014 (Legend of Sheba)
- 2014 Life is Story Runner Up (tie) for Best Biblical Fiction (Legend of Sheba)
- 2014 Inspy Awards Short List (Iscariot)
- 2014 ECPA Christian Book Award for Fiction (Iscariot)
- 2014 Christian Retailers Retailer's Choice Award Finalist (Iscariot)
- 2015 Finalist, ECPA Christian Book Award for Fiction (Legend of Sheba)
- 2016 Indiebound Bestseller List (The Progeny)
- 2017 Inspy Awards Long List (The Progeny)
- 2018 Book of the Year, Realm Makers (Firstborn)
- 2018 Paranormal Winner, Realm Makers (Firstborn)
- 2019 Goodreads Choice Awards Best Mystery/Thriller semifinalist (A Single Light)
- 2019 Literary Titan Gold (A Single Light)
- 2019 Top Shelf Magazine Editor's Choice Award (The Line Between)
- 2019 Literary Titan Silver (The Line Between)
