= Ted Dekker =

American author (born 1962)

- Born: October 24, 1962 (age 64); Kanggime, Yahukimo Regency, Netherlands New Guinea
- Occupation: Novelist
- Spouse: Lee Ann Dekker
- Children: 4, including Rachelle
- Writing career
- Genres: Fantasy, Thriller, Psychological thriller, Horror, Mystery
- Notable works: Thr3e, House, Adam, The Bride Collector, The Priest's Graveyard, Circle Series
- Website: teddekker.com

Ted Dekker (born October 24, 1962) (stylized as TED DEKkER) is an American author of Christian mystery, thriller, and fantasy novels including Thr3e, Obsessed, and the Circle Series.

== Biography ==
Dekker was born in Dutch New Guinea shortly after it had been placed under the United Nations Temporary Executive Authority before becoming a province of Indonesia. His parents, John and Helen, served as missionaries among the Dani people. Ted graduated from high school and took up permanent residence in the United States to study philosophy and religion.

In the early nineties, Dekker turned to writing novels. Over the course of three years, he wrote two full-length novels before starting from scratch and rewriting both. He moved his family to the mountains of Western Colorado and began writing full-time on his third novel. Two years and three novels later his first novel was published. To date, he has written over 30 novels and is best known for psychological thrillers and fantasy tales.

Dekker's novels have sold over 10 million copies worldwide. Two of his novels, Thr3e and House, have been made into movies. Dekker resides in the Nashville area with his wife Lee Ann and one of their daughters.

The oldest of his four children, Rachelle Dekker, is also a writer.

== Awards ==
- 2003 Christy Award Best Fiction Book forThr3e
- 2003 ECPA Gold Medallion Award Best Fiction Book for Thr3e
- 2010 Retailer Choice Award for Green
- 2010 Audio File Earphones Award Best Audiobook for The Bride Collector
- 2010 INSPYs Bloggers Award for Excellence in Faith-Driven Literature Speculative Fiction for Green
- 2012 RT Reviewers Choice Award Inspirational Suspense for The Sanctuary
- 2014 Christy Award Best Suspense Book for Outlaw
- 2015 INSPYs Bloggers Award for Excellence in Faith-Driven Literature Mystery/Thriller for A.D. 30

== Bibliography ==
=== The Books of History Chronicles ===
==== The Circle ====
- Black (novel) (2004)
- Red: The Heroic Rescue (2004)
- White: The Great Pursuit (2004)
- Green: The Beginning and the End (2009) (Known as "Green: The Last Stand" in The Circle 4-in-1 due to Alternate Ending)

==== Beyond the Circle ====
- The 49th Mystic (May 2018)
- Rise of the Mystics (October 2018)

==== The Paradise ====
- Showdown (2005)
- Saint (2007)
- Sinner (2008)

==== The Lost Books ====
- Chosen (2007)
- Infidel (2007)
- Renegade (2008)
- Chaos (2008)
- Lunatic (2009) with Kaci Hill
- Elyon (2009) with Kaci Hill

==== The Books of Mortals ====
- The Keeper (2011) with Tosca Lee
- Forbidden (2011) with Tosca Lee
- Mortal (2012) with Tosca Lee
- Sovereign (2013) with Tosca Lee

==== Other Books Connected to The Books of History Chronicles ====
- House (2006) with Frank Peretti
- Skin (2007)
- Immanuel's Veins (2010)
- The Blood Book (2011) with Kevin Kaiser and Josh Olds
- Genesis (2011)
- To Kill With Reason (2010)

=== Thrillers ===
- Blink (2003)
- Thr3e (2003)
- Obsessed (2005)
- Blink of an Eye (2007)
- Adam (2008)
- Kiss (2009) with Erin Healy
- BoneMan's Daughters (2009)
- Burn (2010) with Erin Healy
- The Bride Collector (2010)
- The Priest's Graveyard (2011)
- The Sanctuary (2012)
- Play Dead (2021)

=== The Caleb Series ===
- Blessed Child (2001) with Bill Bright
- A Man Called Blessed (2002) with Bill Bright

=== The Martyr's Song Series ===
- Heaven's Wager (2000)
- When Heaven Weeps (2001)
- Thunder of Heaven (2002)
- The Martyr's Song (2005)

=== Outlaw Chronicles ===
- Outlaw (2013)
- Eyes Wide Open (2014)
- Water Walker (2014)
- Hacker (2014)

A.D. Series

- A.D. 30 (2014)
- A.D. 33 (2015)

=== Short stories ===
- The Promise (2005)
- The Drummer Boy (2006)

=== Non-fiction ===
- The Slumber of Christianity (2005)
- Tea with Hezbollah (2010) with Carl Medearis
- The Forgotten Way (2015) with Bill Vanderbrush
- The Forgotten Way Meditations (2015) with Bill Vanderbrush
- The Way of Love, Book 1 (2018)
- The Way of Love, Book 2 (2018)

=== The Dream Traveler's Quest ===
- Book 1: Into the Book of Light (2018) with Kara Dekker
- Book 2: The Curse of Shadowman (2018) with Kara Dekker
- Book 3: The Garden and the Serpent (2018) with Kara Dekker
- Book 4: The Final Judgment (2018) with Kara Dekker

=== And They Found Dragons ===
- Book 1: The Boy Who Fell From the Stars (2021) with Rachelle Dekker
- Book 2: Journey to the Silver Towers (2021) with Rachelle Dekker
- Book 3: Rise of the Light Bringer (2021) with Rachelle Dekker

=== Millie Maven ===
- Book 1: The Bronze Medallion (2020) with Rachelle Dekker
- Book 2: The Golden Vial (2020) with Rachelle Dekker
- Book 3: The White Sword (2020) with Rachelle Dekker
