= John Reuben =

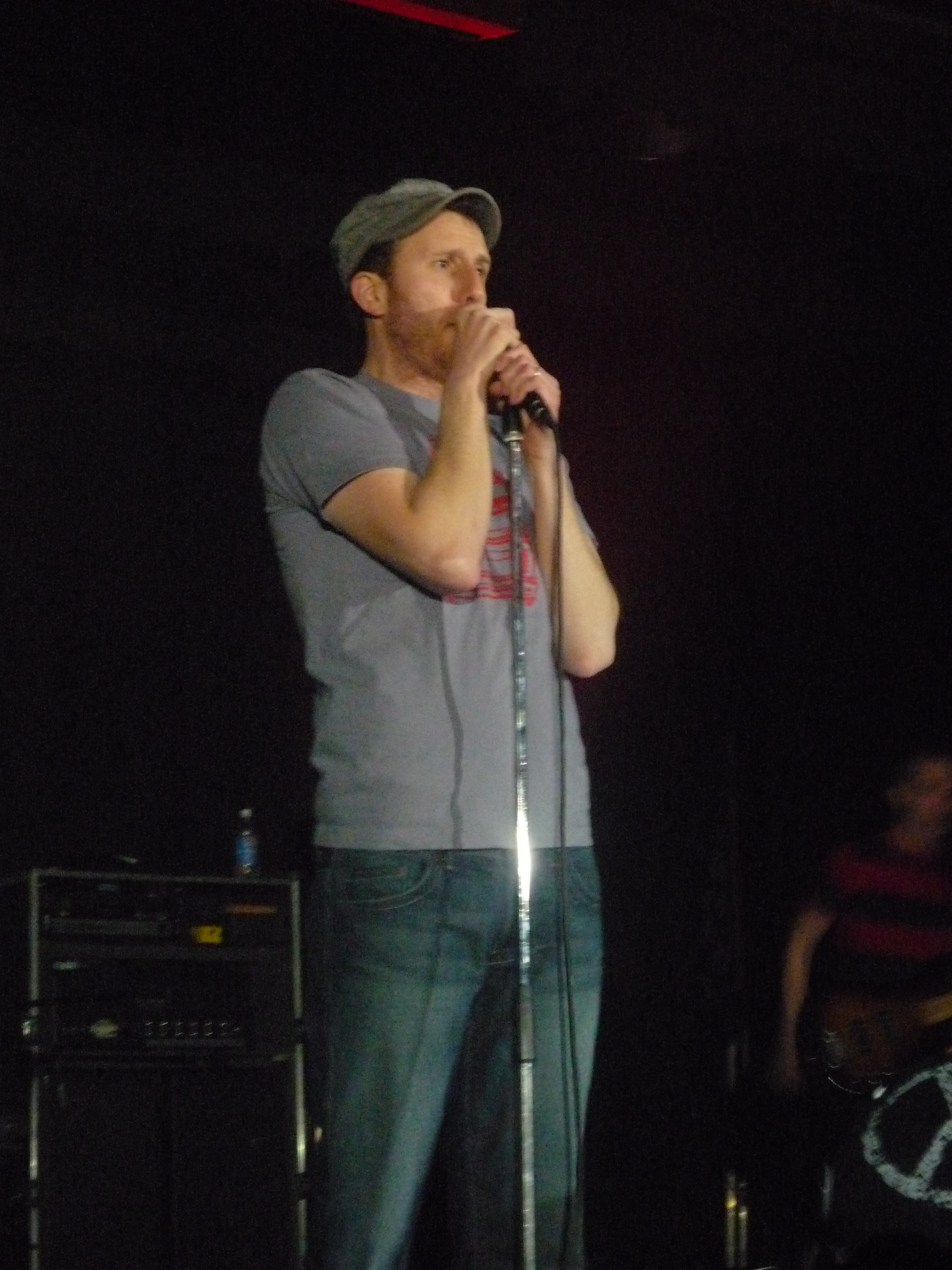
- Reuben on LifeLight tours in Huron, South Dakota, in April 2009

Background information
- Born: John Reuben Zappin; January 14, 1979 (age 47); Columbus, Ohio, U.S.
- Origin: Pataskala, Ohio, U.S.
- Genres: Hip hop, alternative hip hop, Christian hip hop
- Occupation: Recording artist
- Years active: 1994–present
- Label: Gotee
- Website: www.johnreuben.com

John Reuben (born John Reuben Zappin; January 14, 1979) is an American Christian hip hop artist signed to Gotee Records until late 2010. Reuben has sold over 200,000 copies of his first four albums. He released his sixth album, Sex, Drugs and Self-Control on December 22, 2009. The album was nominated for a Dove Award for Rap/Hip-Hop Album of the Year at the 42nd GMA Dove Awards, while the song "No Be Nah" was nominated for Rap/Hip-Hop Recorded Song of the Year.

Reuben continues to tour, and has played and recorded music with many popular Christian music artists such as Five Iron Frenzy, Relient K, The O.C. Supertones, Luke Dowler, Hawk Nelson, MC Lars, and TobyMac.

== Background ==
Reuben is of Jewish heritage and according to his MySpace, his mother is the owner of a Christian Death Metal record label. His brother is Maker Studios CEO Danny Zappin. Raised in Pataskala, Ohio, a suburb of Columbus, Reuben got his start in rapping by taking the bus into the city to rap on open mic nights and participate in rap battles at the age of fifteen. Reuben later released Monuments, an independent EP, which caught the attention of Gotee Records. They took a chance, signing him to the label and releasing his first project, Are We There Yet?, in 2000. TobyMac, the founder of Gotee Records, provided vocals for the album's final track, "God is Love." The album was nominated for a Dove award in 2002.

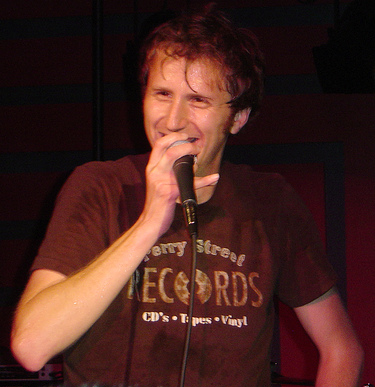
Reuben in September 2005

Reuben's next release, Hindsight (2002), continues his use of a wide variety of musical genres and thoughtful, often funny lyrics. The album was praised as a "truly eclectic and creative hip-hop album that blends old-school sounds with progressive production." Once thought to be a Christian version of Eminem, Reuben's first two releases established him as an original, witty, sarcastic musician, as well as Gotee's top-selling solo rap artist.

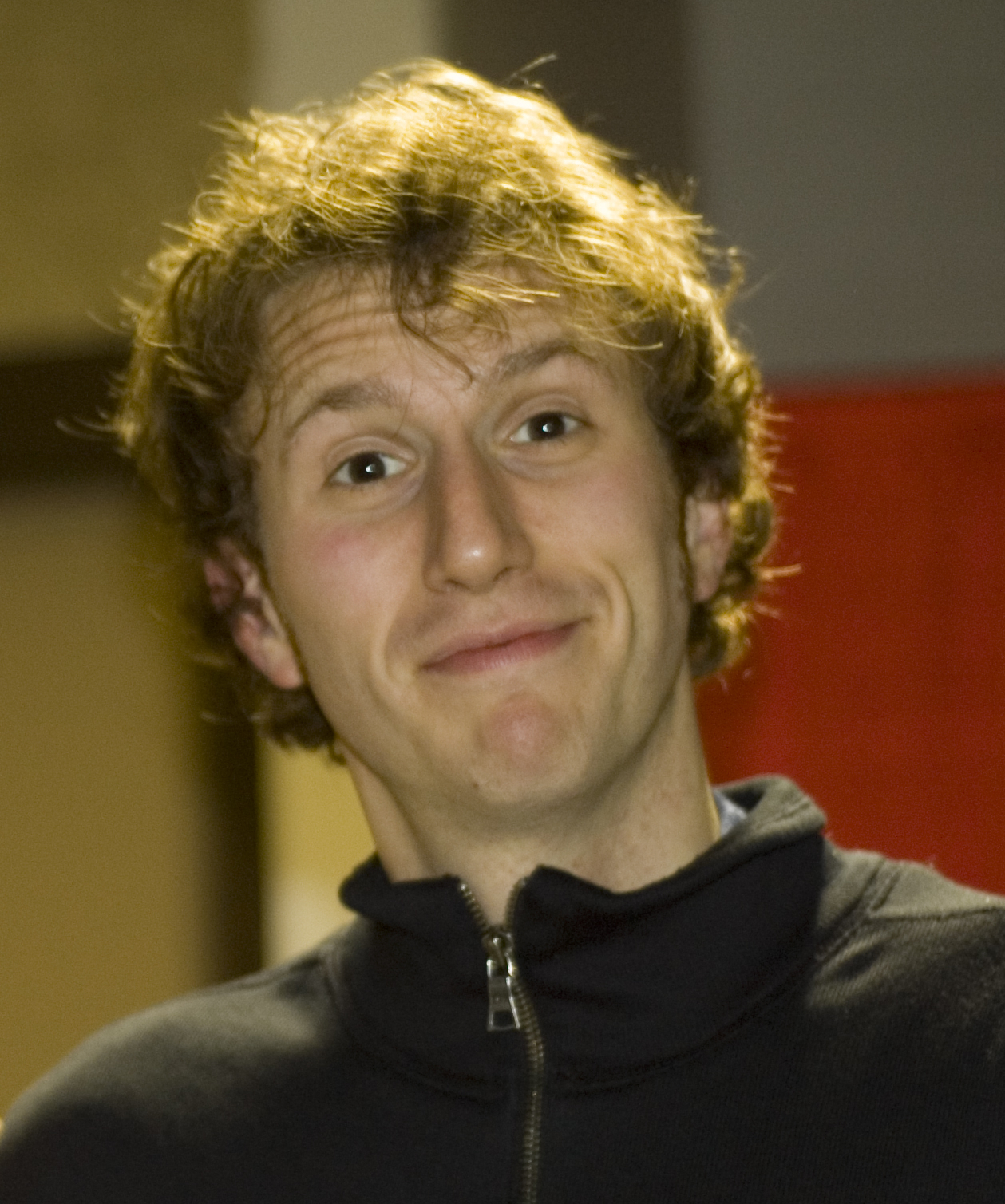
Reuben in 2005

Professional Rapper (2003) marked Reuben's debut as a self-producing artist. The album is noticeably different from his previous efforts, using more instruments and less DJ sampling for the tracks. Along with these differences, the album is noticeably darker in both lyrics and feel. It includes several somber tracks which allow a glimpse into Reuben's struggles and self-doubt. Adrienne Camp of The Benjamin Gate contributes vocals to two tracks on the album.

The following year Reuben released So In Hindsight the Professional Rapper Isn't There Yet (2004), an album of remixed versions of songs from his first three albums.

The Boy vs. The Cynic (2005) continued Reuben's trek from the non-serious songs which characterized his earlier work to music that's far more somber and meditative. Reportedly, when the time came for him to submit his work for the album, Reuben turned in enough tracks for two albums, one light hearted, the other more serious. Rather than releasing a two disc release, the label decided to splice them together into The Boy vs. The Cynic. Relient K's Matt Thiessen contributed to the album's second track, "Nuisance". Tim Skipper of the band House of Heroes appeared on the track "So Glad". On this album most of Reuben's songs used more "traditional" musical instruments, typically the guitar, though he experimented with many different instruments and musical styles.

At this time Reuben also filmed and released the pilot for a reality show detailing his "rise" to stardom while poking fun at many of the conventions of reality television. Though the show was never picked up, the pilot was released on YouTube.

Reuben released his fifth album, Word of Mouth, on February 6, 2007 which took on more experimental characteristics, with the aid of Beck producer Joe Baldridge. Allmusic.com called Word of Mouth an "unqualified triumph" and said that "You won't find a truer, more honest, or more celebratory album this year." Two songs from the album, "Focus" and "Good Evening," were included in the 2007 video game, Thrillville: Off the Rails.

Gotee Records released Reuben's sixth studio album, Sex, Drugs and Self-Control on December 22, 2009. The first single, "Town Folk" was released on July 14, 2009. The next single, "Jamboree", was released August 18, 2009. Followed by "Confident", which was released September 15, 2009, "No be Nah" was released October 14, 2009.

In 2010 a best of collection entitled Zappin was released, before Reuben entered an unannounced musical hiatus that would span until fall of 2016. It was at this time that in anticipation of his next album, Reuben released two singles, "Old as Religion" on September 16, and on December 9, a collaboration with Issac Ryan Brown and Aaron Cole, titled "Angel and Drums". On May 19, 2017 Reuben independently released his seventh studio album Reubonic. The album stirred minor controversy for the inclusion of several curse words within the lyrics; Reuben quickly responded on Instagram and was unapologetic. Reuben released a self-titled album in early 2020.

== Discography ==
=== Studio albums ===
Title	Album details	Peak chart positions
Title	Album details	US Christ
Are We There Yet?	Released: May 9, 2000; Label: Gotee; Format: CD, digital download	—
Hindsight	Released: May 21, 2002; Label: Gotee; Format: CD, digital download	24
Professional Rapper	Released: December 2, 2003; Label: Gotee; Format: CD, digital download	38
The Boy vs. the Cynic	Released: June 21, 2005; Label: Gotee; Format: CD, digital download	27
Word of Mouth	Released: February 6, 2007; Label: Gotee; Format: CD, digital download	43
Sex, Drugs and Self-Control	Released: December 22, 2009; Label: Gotee; Format: CD, digital download	—
Reubonic	Released: May 19, 2017; Label: Future Nostalgia; Format: CD, digital download	—
John Reuben	Released: February 20, 2020; Label: Self-released; Format: CD, digital download	—

=== EPs ===
Title	Album details
Monuments	Released: 1997; Label: Diverse Recordings; Format: CD

=== Compilation albums ===
Title	Album details
So in Hindsight the Professional Rapper Isn't There Yet	Released: December 2004; Label: BEC Recordings; Format: CD, digital download
Zappin (The Best of)	Released: November 2, 2010; Label: Gotee; Format: CD, digital download

=== Singles ===
==== As a featured artist ====
Title	Year	Peak chart positions			Certifications	Album
Title	Year	US Christ	US Christ Airplay	US Christ AC	Certifications	Album
"Grace Got You" (MercyMe featuring John Reuben)	2018	3	1	1	RIAA: Gold	Lifer

=== Music videos ===
- "Do Not"
- "Doin'"
- "Move"
- "Nuisance"
- "Good Evening"
- "Make Money Money"
- "Trying Too Hard"
- "Word of Mouth"
- "Town Folk"
- "No Be Nah"
- "Confident"
- "Jamboree"
- "Candy Coated Razor Blades"
- "Fallen"
- "Bury This Verse"
- "Future Nostalgia"

=== Guest appearances ===
- Coalition: the Hip-Hop Alliance (Compilation, 2000)
- Area (DJ Maj, 2001)
- Extreme Days (Compilation, 2001)
- Collaborations (KJ-52, 2002)
- The Ringleader: Mixtape Volume III (DJ Maj, 2003)
- Roots (The Katinas, 2003)
- Just Ragga (Compilation, 2003)
- X 2004: 17 Christian Rock Hits (Compilation, 2004)
- X 2005: 17 Christian Rock Hits (Compilation, 2005)
- Sens (The Evan Anthem, 2005)
- Hip Hope Hits 2006 (Compilation, 2005)
- Freaked! A Gotee Tribute to dc Talk's "Jesus Freak." (Cover Compilation, 2006)
- Gotee Records: Twenty Years Brand New (Cover Compilation, 2014)
- STAGES (Kim Beyer, 2021)
