= Lifer (album) =

Studio album by MercyMe
- Released: March 31, 2017
- Recorded: 2016–2017
- Studios: Southern Ground Nashville (Nashville, TN); Superphonic Studios (Nashville, TN); The Glovebox Studios (Nashville, TN); The West Barn (Franklin, TN)
- Genres: Contemporary Christian music, worship, pop rock
- Length: 34:55
- Label: Fair Trade
- Producers: David Garcia; Ben Glover; Solomon Olds

MercyMe chronology
MercyMe, It's Christmas! (2015)	Lifer (2017)	Inhale (exhale) (2021)

Singles from Lifer
- 1. "Even If" Released: February 17, 2017; 2. "Grace Got You" Released: March 2, 2018; 3. "Best News Ever" Released: October 5, 2018

Professional ratings
Review scores
Source	Rating
AllMusic	(positive)

Lifer is the ninth studio album from contemporary Christian music band MercyMe, which was released on March 31, 2017, by Fair Trade Services. The album was produced by David Garcia, Ben Glover and Solomon Olds.

The album debuted at No. 1 on the Billboard Christian Album chart and No. 10 on the Billboard 200 chart, selling 33,000 album equivalent units in its first week. The lead single from the album, "Even If", reached No. 1 on the Billboard Christian Songs chart, becoming their twelfth No. 1 on the chart.

== Commercial performance ==
For the Billboard charting week of April 22, 2017, Lifer debuted at No. 10 on the Billboard 200. It also reached No. 1 on the Top Christian Albums chart. The album sold 33,000 album equivalent units in its first week, 30,000 of which are pure sales.

== Track listing ==
All tracks are written by MercyMe, David Garcia, Ben Glover & Solomon Olds, except where noted.

No.	Title	Writer(s)	Length
1.	"Lifer"	MercyMe, Garcia, Glover	3:21
2.	"You Found Me"	MercyMe, Garcia, Glover	3:31
3.	"Grace Got You" (featuring John Reuben)	MercyMe, Garcia, Glover, Olds, John Reuben	3:35
4.	"Best News Ever"	MercyMe, Garcia, Glover, Olds	2:59
5.	"Even If"	MercyMe, Garcia, Glover, Crystal Lewis, Tim Timmons	4:15
6.	"Hello Beautiful"	MercyMe, Garcia, Glover, Olds	3:19
7.	"We Win"	MercyMe, Garcia, Glover, Olds	3:49
8.	"Happy Dance"	MercyMe, Garcia, Glover, Olds	2:51
9.	"Heaven's Here"	MercyMe, Garcia, Glover, Olds	3:36
10.	"Ghost"	MercyMe, Garcia, Glover, Olds	3:39
Total length:			34:55

Deluxe version
No.	Title	Writer(s)	Length
11.	"A Little Hope"	Bart Millard, Christopher Stevens, Bryan Fowler	4:02
12.	"Sing"	MercyMe	3:50
13.	"His Eye is on the Sparrow"	Civilla D. Martin	3:15
Total length:			45:22

== Personnel ==
Credits taken from AllMusic.

MercyMe

- Bart Millard – vocals, backing vocals (4, 5, 8, 10), gang vocals (7), ghost (10)
- Barry Graul – guitars, gang vocals (7), backing vocals (8)
- Mike Scheuchzer – guitars, gang vocals (7), backing vocals (8)
- Nathan Cochran – bass guitar, upright bass (6), gang vocals (7), backing vocals (8)
- Robby Shaffer – drums, gang vocals (7), backing vocals (8)

Additional musicians

- David Garcia – keyboards (1–4, 6–10), programming (1–4, 6–10), additional guitars (6)
- Bryon "Mr. Talkbox" Chambers – clavinet (1)
- Fred Williams – keyboards (2, 4, 5, 9, 10), programming (2, 4, 5, 9, 10)
- Solomon Olds – keyboards (3, 4, 6, 8, 10), programming (3, 4, 6, 8, 10), gang vocals (7)
- Ben Glover – keyboards (4, 5, 8, 10), programming (4, 5, 8, 10), backing vocals (4, 5, 8, 10), gang vocals (7)
- Olandis Gary – SPB (4)
- Dan Michaels – tenor saxophone (8)
- Rob Adams – trombone (8), horn arrangements (8)
- Joshua Harner – trumpet (8)
- Nick Haynes – trumpet (8)
- Joe Murphy – tuba (8)
- John Reuben – guest vocals (3)
- Willy Johnson – backing vocals (4)

=== Production ===
- David Garcia – producer, engineer (1–3, 6–9)
- Ben Glover – producer, engineer (4, 5, 8, 10)
- Solomon Olds – co-producer (6)
- Buckley Miller – engineer (1, 4, 6, 9, 10)
- Ben Phillips – engineer (4, 5, 10)
- Paul Rossetti – engineer (4, 5, 8, 10), additional editing (4, 5, 8, 10)
- Mark Endert – mixing (1, 3, 4, 7, 9)
- Sean Moffitt – mixing (2, 5, 6, 8, 10)
- Joe LaPorta – mastering at Sterling Sound (New York, NY)
- David Molnar – photography
- Dana Salsedo – creative director, grooming
- Brody Harper – art direction
- Nick DePartee – graphic design
- Amber Lehman – wardrobe
- Stephanie Kincheloe – wardrobe assistant
- BrickHouse Entertainment – management

== Charts ==
Chart (2017)	Peak position
US Billboard 200	10
US Top Christian Albums (Billboard)	1

== Certifications ==
Region	Certification	Certified units/sales
United States (RIAA)	Gold	500,000^{‡}
^{‡} Sales+streaming figures based on certification alone.
