= Grace Got You =

Single by MercyMe featuring John Reuben

from the album Lifer
- Released: March 2, 2018
- Recorded: 2016–17
- Genre: CCM, alternative rock
- Length: 3:35
- Label: Fair Trade
- Songwriters: MercyMe, David Garcia, John Reuben, Ben Glover, Solomon Olds
- Producers: David Garcia, Ben Glover, Solomon Olds

MercyMe featuring John Reuben singles chronology
"Even If" (2017)	"Grace Got You" (2018)	"Best News Ever" (2018)

"Grace Got You" is a song by American contemporary Christian music band MercyMe from their 2017 album Lifer. The song features guest vocals from American hip hop artist John Reuben. It was released on March 2, 2018, as the second single. The song peaked at No. 3 on the Hot Christian Songs chart. It also reached at No. 1 on the Christian Airplay chart, becoming their record extending 15th chart topper. It lasted 37 weeks on the overall chart. The song is played in a B minor key, and 87 beats per minute.

It was nominated for the 2019 Grammy Award for Best Contemporary Christian Music Performance/Song and appeared on WOW Hits 2019.

== Background ==
"Grace Got You" was released on March 2, 2018, as the second single for their ninth studio album Lifer. A lyric video was released on December 20, 2017. In an interview with FreeCCM, lead vocalist Bart Millard revealed the meaning behind the song,"'Grace Got You’ is just a song that makes me smile. The whole idea that once you realize that God’s grace has you… no matter what comes your way, you can live your life as if you’ve already read the last page of the book and know how the whole thing turns out. Our eternity is set! On your worst day, Christ is OK with you. He adores you. He’s pleased with you. How is that possible? No clue, but it is. That’s the most amazing news of all! When we originally made the album, we wanted to have someone rap, but we didn’t know who we were going to get. Our paths crossed with a guy who used to be on Gotee Records named John Reuben – who we had done stuff early on with when we were all new together – and we asked him if he’d come out of retirement to rap on the song. It turned out so fun, and totally matched the vibe of the song."

== Track listing ==
CD release

1. "Grace Got You"
2. "Grace Got You (High Key with Background Vocals)"
3. "Grace Got You (High Key without Background Vocals)"
4. "Grace Got You (Medium Key with Background Vocals)"
5. "Grace Got You (Medium Key without Background Vocals)"
6. "Grace Got You (Low Key with Background Vocals)"
7. "Grace Got You (Low Key without Background Vocals)"

== Personnel ==
Credits taken from AllMusic.

MercyMe

- Bart Millard – lead vocals
- Nathan Cochran – bass guitar
- Barry Graul – guitar
- Mike Scheuchzer – guitar
- Robby Shaffer – drums

== Charts ==
=== Weekly charts ===
Chart (2018)	Peak position
US Christian Adult Contemporary (Billboard)	1
US Christian Airplay (Billboard)	1
US Hot Christian Songs (Billboard)	3

=== Year-end charts ===
Chart (2018)	Peak position
US Christian Adult Contemporary (Billboard)	2
US Christian Airplay (Billboard)	2
US Hot Christian Songs (Billboard)	6
