= Are We There Yet? (John Reuben album) =

Studio album by John Reuben
- Released: May 9, 2000
- Genre: Christian hip hop
- Length: 53:17
- Label: Gotee
- Producer: Todd Collins

John Reuben chronology
Are We There Yet? (2000)	(Sees Everything In) Hindsight (2002)

Professional ratings
Review scores
Source	Rating
AllMusic	4.5/5 stars

Are We There Yet? is the first album released by Christian rapper John Reuben. It was released on May 9, 2000, and features the song "Do Not", which was the first song that Reuben made into a music video.

== Track listing ==
1. "Divine Inspiration" (feat. Alon Auguste)—5:32
2. "Do Not"—4:05
3. "No Regrets"—5:44
4. "Him Her He She"—4:33
5. "X-Ray"—5:12
6. "Gather In"—4:35
7. "Rest Easy"—4:57
8. "Hello Ego"—4:26
9. "Jezebel"—4:41
10. "Draw Near"—4:36
11. "Identify" 4:14
12. "Place To Be" 4:33
13. "God Is Love" (featuring tobyMac) -- 4:09
