= Sex, Drugs and Self-Control =

Studio album by John Reuben
- Released: December 22, 2009
- Genre: Christian hip hop
- Label: Gotee
- Producer: Seth Earnest, John Reuben

John Reuben chronology
Word of Mouth (2007)	Sex, Drugs and Self-Control (2009)	Reubonic (2017)

Singles from Sex, Drugs and Self-Control
- 1. "Town Folk" Released: July 14, 2009; 2. "Jamboree" Released: August 18, 2009; 3. "Confident" Released: September 15, 2009; 4. "No Be Nah" Released: October 14, 2009

Professional ratings
Review scores
Source	Rating
Christianity Today	4/5 stars
Cross Rhythms	9/10
Jesus Freak Hideout	4.5/5 stars

Sex, Drugs and Self-Control is the sixth album by rapper John Reuben, released on December 22, 2009.

== Track listing ==
1. "Jamboree"
2. "Radio Makes You Lonely"
3. "Burn It Down"
4. "In the Air"
5. "Paranoid Schizophrenic Apocalyptic Whisper Kitten"
6. "Town Folk"
7. "Confident"
8. "Everett"
9. "No Be Nah"
10. "So Sexy for All the Right Reasons"
11. "Wooden Whistle Man"
12. "Joyful Noise"
13. "20 Something" (**Digital Exclusive)
14. "Come On Jamboree When Radio Makes You Lonely" (**Digital Exclusive)

== Awards ==
The album was nominated for a Dove Award for Rap/Hip-Hop Album of the Year at the 42nd GMA Dove Awards, while the song "No Be Nah" was nominated for Rap/Hip-Hop Recorded Song of the Year.
