= Hindsight (John Reuben album) =

(Sees Everything In) Hindsight

Studio album by John Reuben
- Released: May 21, 2002
- Genre: Christian hip hop
- Length: 50:00 (Estimate)
- Label: Gotee
- Producer: John Reuben

John Reuben chronology
Are We There Yet? (2000)	(Sees Everything In) Hindsight (2002)	Professional Rapper (2003)

Professional ratings
Review scores
Source	Rating
AllMusic	2/5 stars
Christianity Today	3.5/5 stars
Cross Rhythms	8/10

Hindsight (also known as Sees Everything In Hindsight) is the second album by rapper John Reuben, released on May 21, 2002.

== Track listing ==
1. "I'll Try Harder"
2. "I John Reu"
3. "Hindsight"
4. "Big E Cypher Session"
5. "Soundman"
6. "Run the Night"
7. "Breathe"
8. "I Pictured It"
9. "01/08/02"
10. "Doin'"
11. "Thank You" (feat. Manchild of Mars ILL & Othello)
12. "DJ Manuel"
13. "Up and at Them"
14. "Defensive Offender"
15. "Pataskala"
