= The Boy vs. the Cynic =

The Boy vs. The Cynic

Studio album by John Reuben
- Released: June 21, 2005
- Genre: Christian hip hop
- Length: 42:58
- Label: Gotee
- Producer: Grant Harrison

John Reuben chronology
So in Hindsight the Professional Rapper Isn't There Yet (2004)	The Boy vs. The Cynic (2005)	Word of Mouth (2007)

Professional ratings
Review scores
Source	Rating
Christianity Today	3.5/5 stars
Cross Rhythms	8/10
Jesus Freak Hideout	4/5 stars

The Boy Vs. the Cynic is the fourth album by John Reuben released in 2005 on Gotee Records. It features the hit "Nuisance".

== Track listing ==
1. "Out of Control" — 3:50
2. "Nuisance" (featuring Matthew Thiessen of Relient K) — 3:37
3. "Chapter 1" — 2:49
4. "Follow Your Leader" — 3:10
5. "Sales Pitch" — 3:45
6. "Sunshine" — 3:21
7. "So Glad" (featuring Tim Skipper of House of Heroes) — 3:12
8. "What About Them?" — 3:49
9. "There's Only Forgiveness" — 4:07
10. "All I Have" — 3:54
11. "Cooperate" — 3:30
12. "The Boy vs. The Cynic" — 6:19

All tracks were produced by Grant Harrison.

== Awards ==
In 2006, the album was nominated for two Dove Awards: Rap/Hip-Hop Album of the Year and Recorded Music Packaging of the Year, at the 37th GMA Dove Awards.
