= Best News Ever =

Single by MercyMe

from the album Lifer
- Released: October 5, 2018
- Recorded: 2016–2017
- Genre: CCM; worship; pop rock
- Length: 2:59
- Label: Fair Trade
- Songwriters: MercyMe; David Garcia; Ben Glover; Solomon Olds
- Producers: Garcia; Glover; Olds

MercyMe singles chronology
"Grace Got You" (2018)	"Best News Ever" (2018)

"Best News Ever" is the third single by contemporary Christian music band MercyMe for their ninth studio album, Lifer (2017). It impacted Christian radio on October 5, 2018. The song peaked at No. 4 on the US Hot Christian Songs chart, becoming their twenty-sixth top ten single, tying Casting Crowns as the band with the most top ten singles. The song is played in a B major key, and 94 beats per minute.

== Background ==
"Best News Ever" was released as the third single from Lifer on October 5, 2018. Lead vocalist of the band, Bart Millard, shared the story behind the song in an interview with FreeCCM, "I will honestly say it’s one of my favorite messages on the record. It’s the way I grew up which was ‘be all you can be, you get what you deserve and work harder and try harder.’ And It's like wait a minute, what if somebody (which somebody did), but what if they came and told me ‘hey the works already done the fight's already been won, you don’t have to try so hard.’ That's what makes the Gospel not just the good news but the best news ever." On October 30, 2018, a lyric video for the track was released.

== Composition ==
"Best News Ever" is originally in the key of B major, with a tempo of 94 beats per minute. Written in common time, Millard's vocal range spans from G_{4} to A_{5} during the song.

== Commercial performance ==
It debuted at No. 48 on the Billboard Christian Airplay chart on the issue week of October 13, 2018. It rose to No. 30 the following week. On its tenth week, it reached the top ten, their twenty-fifth top ten. It became their sixteenth Christian Airplay number one, and third from Lifer. It debuted at No. 49 on the Hot Christian Songs chart. It rose up to No. 36 the following week. On its sixteenth week, it reached the top ten, becoming the band's twenty-sixth top ten, tying for the second most top tens in the chart's history. It peaked at No. 4. It departed from the chart after 30 weeks.

== Charts ==
Chart (2019)	Peak position
US Christian Adult Contemporary (Billboard)	1
US Christian Airplay (Billboard)	1
US Hot Christian Songs (Billboard)	4
