= Word of Mouth (John Reuben album) =

Fifth album by rapper John Reuben

Studio album by John Reuben
- Released: February 6, 2007
- Genre: Christian hip hop
- Length: 36:09
- Label: Gotee
- Producer: Joe Baldridge

John Reuben chronology
The Boy vs. The Cynic (2005)	Word of Mouth (2007)	Sex, Drugs and Self-Control (2009)

Professional ratings
Review scores
Source	Rating
AllMusic	4.5/5 stars
Christianity Today	4/5 stars
Cross Rhythms	8/10
Jesus Freak Hideout	4.5/5 stars
PopMatters	6/10
Rapzilla	3.5/5 stars

Word of Mouth is the fifth album by rapper John Reuben, released on February 6, 2007.

The songs "Focus" and "Good Evening" were featured in the 2007 video game Thrillville: Off the Rails by LucasArts.

== Track listing ==
1. "Sing It Like You Mean It" – 3:06
2. "Tryin' Too Hard" – 3:09
3. "Make Money Money" – 4:29
4. "Focus" – 3:32
5. "Word of Mouth" – 4:04
6. "Miserable Exaggeration" – 3:28
7. "Universal" – 3:42
8. "Curiosity" – 3:18
9. "Cool the Underdog" – 3:27
10. "Good Evening" – 3:53

== Awards ==
In 2008, the album was nominated for a Dove Award for Rap/Hip-Hop Album of the Year at the 39th GMA Dove Awards. The title song was also nominated for Rap/Hip-Hop Recorded Song of the Year.
