= Even If (MercyMe song) =

Single by MercyMe

from the album Lifer
- Released: February 17, 2017
- Length: 4:15
- Label: Fair Trade Services
- Songwriters: Bart Millard; Ben Glover; Crystal Lewis; David Garcia; Tim Timmons
- Producers: Glover; Garcia

MercyMe singles chronology
| "Dear Younger Me" (2016) | "Even If" (2017) | "Grace Got You" (2018) |

"Even If" is a song by the American Christian rock band MercyMe. The song was released to Christian radio in the United States on February 17, 2017, via Fair Trade Services, as the lead single from the group's ninth studio album, Lifer. It samples the traditional hymn "It Is Well with My Soul". The song was written by Bart Millard, Ben Glover, Crystal Lewis, David Garcia, and Tim Timmons, while production was handled by Glover and Garcia.

"Even If" was a commercial success upon release. The song experienced massive airplay in the United States, leading it to the top position of the Billboard and Mediabase Christian Airplay charts for nineteen consecutive weeks. On the overall Hot Christian Songs chart, the song led for three weeks following a number 37 debut two months prior. It reached number 20 on the Bubbling Under Hot 100 Singles chart. "Even If" received praise for its slow and emotional nature in comparison to the upbeat pop styles found in the rest of Lifer. It was nominated for several notable awards and won the K-Love Fan Award for Song of the Year in 2018.

== Background ==
Timmons initially wrote a portion of the song, although was experiencing difficulty in completing it and had spent five years attempting to, with no avail; as a result, he asked Millard to complete the song. The lyrics have been inspired by Timmons' life with terminal cancer, which he had been struggling with at the time of the song's writing. Millard's addition was inspired by his son's diagnosis with juvenile diabetes when he was two years old.

== Style ==
"If there's a moment on the record to reach people where they are, it's 'Even If'. We're ministers first. We're trying to reach the hurting first. This song wrecked us. It's just an open wound for me. It's very real. The whole point of the song for me is the change that Jesus made in my life is so real and so life-transforming that if He went dark, if He went silent from now on, He would still be my greatest hope because of what He has already done. Basically, there's not a single circumstance, I pray, that can derail me from what Christ is to me and who I am because of Christ."

— Frontman Bart Millard, in an interview with CBN.

=== Composition ===
"Even If" is an adult contemporary-style ballad, in contrast with the upbeat pop and funk styles which characterize much of Lifer. Many critics consistently noted radio‑friendly arrangement, built around piano, steady percussion, and frontman Millard's vocal performance. Mark Rice of Jesus Freak Hideout described it as "the only song with an adult contemporary sound" on the album, adding that its placement "is a prime example of great sequencing and selective exposure done right" because it provides a calm sound within an otherwise energetic record. In an additional review for Jesus Freak Hideout, Christopher Smith praised that the song "gives a different perspective on what it means to be a lifer: experiencing peace in the midst of doubt".

Timothy Yap of Jubilee Cast observed the production's emotional weight, calling it "a heartfelt affirmation" supported by "powerful drums woven through" the arrangement. In a similar vein, Lori Lebel of Today's Christian Entertainment described it as "a heartfelt beautiful piece with powerful drums woven through". Because Lifer is predominantly characterized with upbeat production, critics frequently described "Even If" to be the most emotional standout of the album. Jared Allen of A Front Row View called it "a beautiful ballad" that slows the pacing "in such a beautiful way",while Emily Caroline of The Christian Beat noted that its reflective tone "speaks directly from [the album's] inspiration", offering a counterbalance to the surrounding pop‑driven material.

=== Lyrics and meaning ===
The song has widely been considered to be one of MercyMe's most personal recordings, written after Millard learned that his teenage son had been diagnosed with a chronic illness. Yap explained that the track is "essentially a heartfelt affirmation that God still remains the greatest even when our circumstances aren't." The lyrics center on steadfast faith in the midst of suffering, expressing trust in God even if he does not intervene, an idea reviewers repeatedly highlight as the emotional core of the song. Critics observed that the song's message aligns with the album's broader themes of perseverance and Christian identity. Lucas Munachen of Jesus Freak Hideout labeled it as "the best of [the album's] ballads", praising its articulation of the truth that "although darkness may abound around us, our hope is in Christ alone." Caroline described the song as "a beautiful and powerful reminder that in moments when God chooses to not move mountains... we still love Him for all He has done for us".

Critics also emphasized the song's honesty. Mark Rice of Jesus Freak Hideout argued that its emotional weight is heightened by its placement within an upbeat album, transforming it into a highlight, partially because of its contrast. UWire noted that the song may surprise listeners who have become accustomed to the album's upbeat tone, describing it as "sweet sounding and very inspirational", albeit "out of place". Lins Honeyman of Cross Rhythms emphasized the song's emotional honesty, describing it as a track that "expertly highlights the challenges of trying to communicate the good news to the masses with a feeling of brokenness inside."

== Reception ==
=== Critical ===
Several critics identified the track as one of the standouts on Lifer. Munachen writes that it is "the best of [the album's] ballads", praising its emotional resonance. Rice argued that its impact is amplified by the album's alternating style, stating that "by sequencing and selectiveness alone, it is transformed into a highlight". Yap described the song as one of the album's "triumphant" moments, emphasizing its personal vulnerability. Allen also went on to praise its emotional style, calling it "an amazing song" that "slows things way down with such a beautiful ballad". Lebel similarly noted its strength, describing it as "a heartfelt beautiful piece" that anchors the album's reflective side. Several critics also commented on its radio-friendly and commercial appeal. Caroline stated that it had already become a Christian radio hit prior to the album's release, calling it "a beautiful and powerful reminder" of faith amid hardship. UWire noted that the song's solemn tone differs from the rest of the album, as well as describing it as "sweet sounding and very inspirational."

=== Legacy ===
In 2026, a biopic titled I Can Only Imagine 2 was released. The film detailed the background behind the writing of "Even If".

=== Commercial ===
"Even If" was a commercial success upon release. In the United States, the track received 74 first-week radio adds, leading it to become MercyMe's most successful first-week debut on Christian radio. It debuted at number 13 on the Billboard Christian Airplay chart. The song debuted on the overall Hot Christian Songs chart for the week of February 25, 2017, where it opened at number 37 that week. For the week of April 22, 2017, the song rose 2-1, surpassing Hillsong Worship's "What a Beautiful Name" to lead the chart. That week, it entered the Bubbling Under Hot 100 Singles chart at number 20, and remained there for one week. On May 6, 2017, "Even If" rose to lead the Christian Adult Contemporary chart, and on July 1, it led the Christian Airplay chart. It remained atop the latter for nineteen consecutive weeks.

In 2026, the song was certified triple platinum by the Recording Industry Association of America for selling at least three million copies in the United States. Also that year, following the release of I Can Only Imagine 2, "Even If" managed to debut on the Digital Song Sales chart, where it peaked at number 8. It entered the Christian Digital Song Sales that same week in the top position.

=== Accolades ===
| Year | Organization | Category | Result | Ref. |
|---|---|---|---|---|
| 2017 | GMA Dove Awards | Song of the Year | Nominated | |
| 2017 | We Love Awards | Song of the Year | Won | |
| 2018 | Grammy Awards | Best Contemporary Christian Song | Nominated | |
| 2018 | Billboard Music Awards | Top Christian Song | Nominated | |
| 2018 | K-Love Fan Awards | Song of the Year | Won | |

Year-end lists
| Publication | Accolade | Rank | Ref. |
|---|---|---|---|
| ASCAP | Most Performed Christian Songs 2018 | —N/a | |
| Jesus Freak Hideout | Nicole Marie Vacca Song Picks | 1 | |
| Jesus Freak Hideout | Alex Caldwell's Song Picks | 5 | |

== Charts ==
=== Weekly charts ===
2017 weekly chart performance for "Even If"
| Chart (2017) | Peak position |
|---|---|
| US Bubbling Under Hot 100 (Billboard) | 20 |
| US Christian Adult Contemporary (Billboard) | 1 |
| US Christian Airplay (Billboard) | 1 |
| US Hot Christian Songs (Billboard) | 1 |

2026 weekly chart performance for "Even If"
| Chart (2026) | Peak position |
|---|---|
| US Digital Song Sales (Billboard) | 8 |
| US Christian Digital Song Sales (Billboard) | 1 |

=== Year-end charts ===
| Chart (2017) | Position |
|---|---|
| US Hot Christian Songs (Billboard) | 2 |
| US Christian Airplay (Billboard) | 1 |
| US Christian AC (Billboard) | 1 |
| Chart (2018) | Position |
| US Hot Christian Songs (Billboard) | 34 |

=== Decade-end charts ===
| Chart (2010s) | Position |
|---|---|
| US Hot Christian Songs (Billboard) | 9 |

== Certifications ==
| Region | Certification | Certified units/sales |
|---|---|---|
| United States (RIAA) | 3× Platinum | 3,000,000^{‡} |
^{‡} Sales+streaming figures based on certification alone.

== Release history ==
Release history for "Even If"
| Region | Date | Format | Label | Ref. |
|---|---|---|---|---|
| United States | February 15, 2017 | Christian Radio | Fair Trade Services | |
| Various | February 17, 2017 | Digital download; streaming | Fair Trade Services | |
| Various | March 31, 2017 | CD; LP; (with Lifer) | Fair Trade Services | |
