= So in Hindsight the Professional Rapper Isn't There Yet =

Remix album by John Reuben
- Released: December 2004
- Genre: Christian hip hop
- Length: 48:04
- Label: BEC Recordings
- Producer: Liquid Beats, DJ Form, Elected Official

John Reuben chronology
Professional Rapper (2003)	So in Hindsight the Professional Rapper Isn't There Yet (2004)	The Boy vs. the Cynic (2005)

Professional ratings
Review scores
Source	Rating
Christianity Today	2004

So in Hindsight the Professional Rapper Isn't There Yet is a remix album by Christian hip hop artist John Reuben.

== Track listing ==
1. "Do Not" (Liquid Beats Club remix)
2. "Divine Inspiration" (Elected Official remix)
3. "Gather In" (DJ Form remix)
4. "Hindsight" (Elected Official remix)
5. "Breathe" (Liquid Beatsremix)
6. "Doin'" (Liquid Beats remix)
7. "Move" (DJ Form remix)
8. "I Haven't Been Myself" (DJ Form remix)
9. "Life Is Short" (Elected Official remix)
10. "Do Not" (Liquid Beats Smoothed Out remix)
11. "Gather In" (Elected Official remix)
12. "Life Is Short" (DJ Form remix)
