= Luke Dowler =

American singer-songwriter

- Born: Luke Michael Dowler; July 18, 1981 (age 45); Kalispell, Montana, United States
- Genres: pop, folk, rock
- Occupations: Musician, songwriter
- Instruments: Vocals, guitar, bass, piano
- Years active: 2005–present
- Website: lukedowler.com

Luke Dowler (born July 18, 1981) is an American songwriter, performer, and producer based in northwest Montana. Dowler has released a large catalogue of EPs, LPs and singles. In 2014, Paste magazine called Dowler ‘a Montana artist you needed to listen to now’, as part of their 50 states project.

== Biography ==
Luke Dowler was born in Kalispell, Montana, United States, but moved frequently as he was the son of a Marine. His body of work is varied but often informed by social issues and causes. In 2012, Dowler signed to EMI/Dream Records, and released the album, Polarized, receiving comparisons to artists as varied as Needtobreathe, Bruce Springsteen, Bob Marley and Mike Ness.

After leaving Dream Records, to pursue other independent projects, Dowler released two EPs West and North, as well as the single "Heart Attack", all of which found some success on college radio and garnered praise from outlets such as Paste magazine., Relevant Magazine and Montana Public Radio

== Discography ==
=== Studio albums ===
- 2007: Behind Counterfeit Smiles (JED Records)
- 2010: Compared To You (JED Records)
- 2012: Polarized (Dream/EMI)
- 2014: WEST (Independent/Wintercrest Studios)
- 2014: NORTH (Independent/Wintercrest Studios)

=== Singles ===
- 2011: "Silence Is Shameful" (JED Records)
- 2014: "Heart Attack" (JED Records)
