= Hodder =

Hodder is an English surname, derived from the Old English word "hod", meaning hood. Therefore, the original bearer of the name was a seller or maker of hoods.

== People ==
- Alfred Hodder (1866–1907), American author, attorney and academic
- Bill Hodder (1865–1897), English footballer
- Christopher Hodder-Williams (1926–1995), British writer
- Clark Hodder (1903–1968), American athlete, coach and administrator
- Courtney Hodder (born 2000), Australian rules footballer
- Daria Hodder, Australian professional wrestler known as Zaria
- Dick Hodder (1923–2006), British geographer and academic
- Errol Hodder (born 1938), Australian trade unionist
- Francis Hodder (1906–1943), Irish cricketer, rugby union player and Royal Air Force officer
- Frank Heywood Hodder (1860–1935), American historian
- Harvey Hodder (1943–2020), Canadian politician
- Ian Hodder (born 1948), British archaeologist
- Jessie Donaldson Hodder (1867–1931), American women's prison reformer
- Jim Hodder (musician) (1947–1990), American musician, from Steely Dan
- Jim Hodder (politician) (1940–2021), Canadian politician
- Justine Hodder (born 1972), Australian tennis player
- Kane Hodder (born 1955), American actor and stuntman
- Mark Hodder, English writer
- Mary Hodder (1945–2025), Canadian politician
- Michael Hodder (1968–1999), British train driver killed in the Ladbroke Grove rail crash
- Paul Hodder (born 1965), New Zealand rugby player and cricketer
- Robin Hodder (1937–2006), Australian field hockey player
- Stephen Hodder, MBE (born 1956), English architect
- Walter Hodder (1909–1993), Canadian educator and politician
- Wilfred Hodder (1896–1957), Welsh rugby footballer
- William Hodder (born 1947), Australian sailor
- Liam Hodder (Hodder), (Born 1997) Canadian Rapper, Singer/Songwriter

== Other uses ==
- Hodder & Stoughton, a British publisher
- Kane Hodder (band), American hardcore band
- River Hodder, a river in Lancashire, England
- Hodder River, a river in New Zealand
- SS Hodder, a freight vessel

== See also ==
- Hoder (disambiguation)
- Hodor (disambiguation)
