= Herman Vandenburg Ames =

American author and academic (1865–1935)

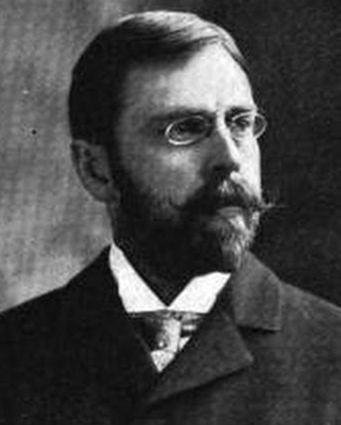
- Born: August 7, 1865; Lancaster, Massachusetts, U.S.
- Died: February 7, 1935 (aged 69); Philadelphia, Pennsylvania, U.S.
- Occupations: Historian, educator
- Years active: 1897–1933
- Title: Professor
- Board member of: Order of the Founders and Patriots of America (Governor-General); Public Archives Commission of the American Historical Association (President)
- Parent(s): Marcus Ames; Jane Angeline Ames (née Vandenburg)
- Awards: Justin Winsor Prize (1897)

Academic background
- Education: Amherst College (AB); Harvard University (AM, PhD)
- Thesis: The Proposed Amendments to the Constitution of the United States (1891)
- Doctoral advisor: Albert Bushnell Hart

Academic work
- Discipline: History
- Sub-discipline: Legal history
- Institutions: University of Michigan; Ohio State University; University of Pennsylvania
- Doctoral students: Herbert Eugene Bolton; Arthur Charles Cole; John Musser
- Notable students: Ezra Pound
- Main interests: History of the U.S. Constitution
- Notable works: The Proposed Amendments to the Constitution of the United States During the First Century of Its History (1896)

Herman Vandenburg Ames (/eɪmz/; August 7, 1865 – February 7, 1935) was an American legal historian, archivist, and professor of United States constitutional history at the University of Pennsylvania and, from 1907 to 1928, dean of its graduate school. His 1897 monograph, The Proposed Amendments to the Constitution of the United States During the First Century of Its History, was a landmark work in American constitutional history. Other works by Ames included John C. Calhoun and the Secession Movement of 1850, Slavery and the Union 1845–1861, and The X.Y.Z. Letters, the latter of which he authored with John Bach McMaster. Among his notable students were Ezra Pound, John Musser, and Herbert Eugene Bolton.

A member of the Ames family, Herman Ames was born in Massachusetts and educated at Amherst College. He received his doctorate from Harvard University, where he was the Ozias Goodwin Memorial Fellow in Constitutional and International Law, and studied under Albert Bushnell Hart. Like Hart, Ames spent time in Europe learning German historical methodology and was influenced in his own research by its approach. He was a driving force behind the establishment of the Pennsylvania State Archives and helped guide the widespread establishment of government archives throughout the United States. His papers are housed at the University of Pennsylvania's University Archives.

== Early life ==
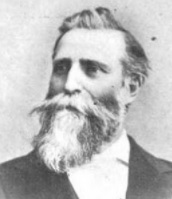
Herman Ames' father, Marcus Ames, was a minister.

=== Childhood and family ===
Herman Ames was born in Lancaster, Massachusetts, in 1865 to Marcus Ames and Jane Angeline Ames (née Vandenburg).

Ames' father, Marcus, was educated at Philips Andover Academy, where he graduated as valedictorian before studying medicine at Harvard Medical School. He was ordained in 1854, becoming in the words of David Ford a "brilliant, fervent, and impressive" Congregational preacher who ministered throughout Massachusetts, later serving as superintendent of the Lancaster Industrial School for Girls and chaplain of Rhode Island's asylum, prison, workhouse, and almshouse. Marcus Ames' parents—Herman Ames' paternal grandparents—were Azel Ames and Mercy Ames (née Hatch). Herman Ames' great-grandfather, Job Ames, served in the Massachusetts Militia during the American Revolution. The Ames family descended from William Ames, who immigrated to the Province of Massachusetts Bay from the town of Bruton, England, in 1641.

The family's surname may have been a corruption of the name Amyas (meaning "merchant of Amiens"). In the 16th century Amyas was frequently confused with Ames.

=== Education ===
Ames was educated at the Mowry and Goff School in Providence, Rhode Island. After graduating, he enrolled at Brown University before transferring to Amherst College, where he was initiated into the Delta Upsilon fraternity and later became the chapter president. During the Delta Upsilon convention of 1887, Ames played a central role in resolving an intra-fraternity dispute concerning the authority by which the Executive Council of Delta Upsilon had admitted the DePauw University chapter some months earlier. As a student at Amherst, he was particularly influenced by Anson D. Morse, whom he credited with cultivating in him "a judicial attitude in the study of history", years later recalling that he had "never come in contact with a teacher who was so judicially minded".

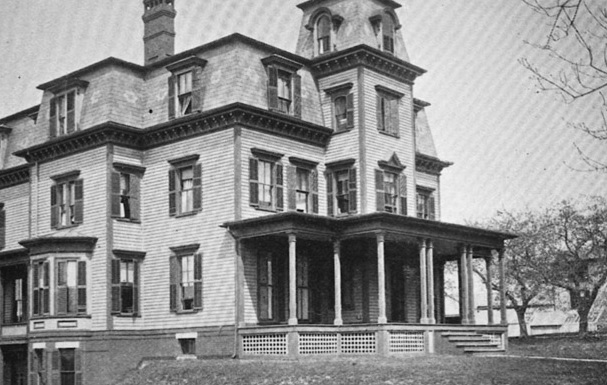
Herman Ames was initiated into Delta Upsilon at Amherst College, whose chapter house is shown here at about the time he was its president.

Ames graduated from Amherst with an A.B. degree in 1888, and thereafter entered Harvard University. At Harvard he received an A.M. in 1890 and a Ph.D. the following year for his dissertation The Proposed Amendments to the Constitution of the United States, which was done under the supervision of Albert Bushnell Hart. During his time at Harvard, he was the Ozias Goodwin Memorial Fellow in Constitutional and International Law.

Between 1891 and 1894, Ames lectured in history at the University of Michigan under an appointment as acting assistant professor to fill a vacancy created by the resignation of J.H.T. McPherson. Though his interest was in U.S. history, at Michigan Ames was charged with teaching courses covering a variety of periods of world history, an assignment to which he would admit he was "not particularly prepared", but he resigned himself to the idea that "one must make a beginning somewhere, and this was the opening offered". He later recalled this first teaching experience "was a valuable one to me, far more so, I fear, than to the students taught. I was afforded the opportunity to become acquainted with the life and work of the leading state university of the time".

Ames spent 1895 abroad, taking advanced studies in history at Leipzig University and Heidelberg University. During his fifteen months in Europe, he also undertook a grand tour.

== Career ==
=== Teaching ===
The year following his return from Germany, Ames was hired as an assistant professor in the history department at Ohio State University. In 1897, he moved to the University of Pennsylvania to continue teaching history, and by 1908 had become a full professor. From 1907 to 1928, he served as dean of Pennsylvania's graduate school. As dean, Ames made his office in room 105 of College Hall, a room which he shared with the rest of the graduate school staff. (Note: The graduate school would move to Bennett Hall after its completion in 1925; H. Lamar Crosby would later note that the additional space meant Ames "had a room all to himself".) Under his administration, the number of graduate students at Pennsylvania increased five-fold and, in 1923, he consulted with U.S. Secretary of State Charles Evans Hughes — a fellow member of Delta Upsilon — on implementing a scholarship to fund the study of diplomacy at Pennsylvania using an $80,000 endowment from the late Frederic Courtland Penfield, which was among the largest university scholarship funds in existence at that time.

At Pennsylvania, Ames established a reputation for "tact, firmness and high ideals of scholarship". John Musser, one of his former students and graduate assistants, recalled that Ames' relationship with his students was accessible, courteous, and helpful and that he was known for welcoming students to his home and keeping notes on their careers after they had graduated. University provost Josiah Penniman would echo Musser's assessment, stating that he knew "of no dean who was more deeply interested in the graduate students of the University, not only those who were studying American History, but all who were studying in any courses".

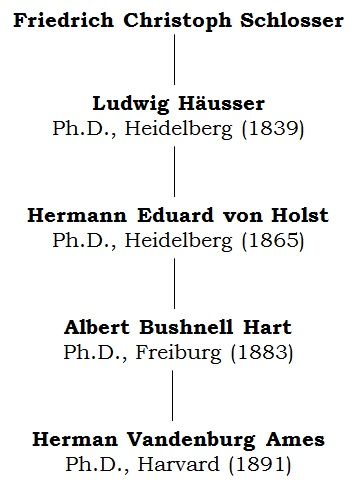
A pedigree chart showing the academic genealogy of Herman Ames (Note: Ames received his doctorate at Harvard where he was supervised by Alfred Bushnell Hart who, in turn, received his doctorate at the University of Freiburg under Hermann Eduard von Holst. Von Holst received his doctorate at the University of Heidelberg under the supervision of Ludwig Häusser who, in turn, received his doctorate at Heidelberg under the supervision of Friedrich Christoph Schlosser.)

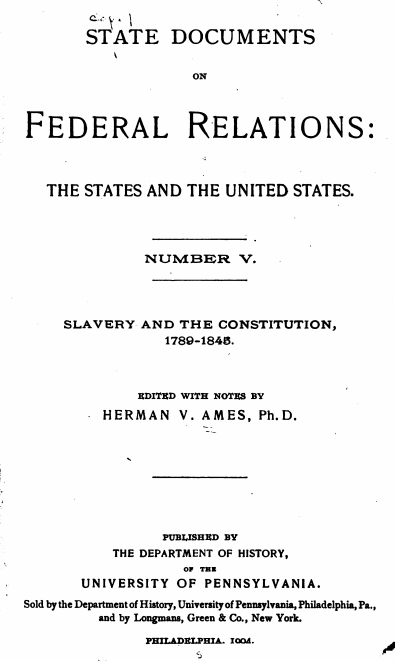
Ames was the editor of one volume of the multi-issue State Documents on Federal Relations.

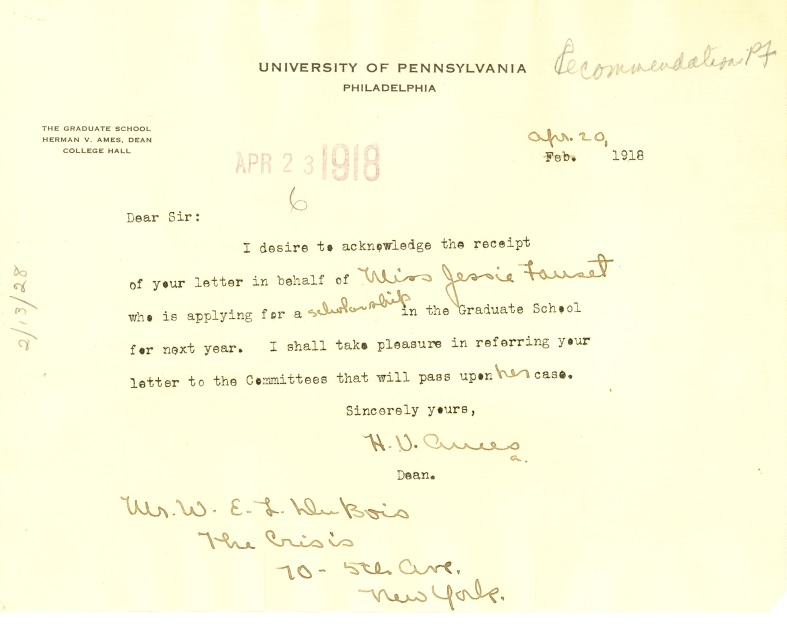
A 1918 note from Ames to W.E.B. DuBois concerning a student recommendation

During the 1901–02 academic year, Ames was one of Ezra Pound's instructors at Pennsylvania; Pound scholar David Ten Eyck credits him with stimulating the poet's interest in American history. Pound would later recall that Ames' "courses had a vitality outlasting the mere time of his lectures" and would humorously note that Ames was "undisturbed and undistracted" by students playing ping pong outside his office. (Note: Ping pong was a new game at the turn of the 20th century and became a "craze" in the United States during the period 1901 to 1903.) According to Ten Eyck, studies of Pound's notes from Ames' courses indicate his "deep interest in the subject that must have provided a foundation for [Pound's] later reflections on American history". After Ames' death, Pound would note that—though they had no more contact than "perhaps two or three letters" in the ensuing decades—he continued to harbor a "strong, personal affection" towards Ames, citing this as proof of "humanity overcoming all systems of invented partition". Another notable student of Ames was Herbert Eugene Bolton. (Note: While Ames was among Bolton's instructors, Bolton's dissertation supervisor was John Bach McMaster, with whom Ames would later collaborate on the X.Y.Z. Letters.)

As a scholar of legal history, his view of the United States Constitution was at once both liberal in its outlook while also guarded at attempts to meddle with its basic framework. When the eighteenth amendment, introducing prohibition of alcohol, was enacted he immediately and correctly predicted its eventual repeal.

In his view on history, Ames was both presentist and relativist; during a public lecture given at Muhlenberg College in 1909 he characterized the daily customs and behavior of early American settlers as "barbarous" compared to contemporary standards, and credited the growth of democracy with the development of more liberal social norms. At the same time, however, he cautioned about passing moral judgments on leaders of the past based on modern expectations. As an instructor of history, Ames was described by contemporary historian Wayne Journell as "unabashedly" supportive of its use to invigorate support for the government's policies during World War I, quoting him that "it is the duty of the teacher of history and civics to seize the wonderful opportunity afforded by the war to aid in promoting an intelligent and patriotic public opinion in support of the government in these critical times". Musser offered contradictory recollections of Ames' academic approach, describing him as having a completely objective and impartial view towards both history and current affairs and viewing with skepticism the idea that concerns such as politics or national interest should influence his teaching or research.

In the summer of 1908, Ames was a visiting lecturer at the University of Wisconsin–Madison where he taught the course "Political and Constitutional History of the United States, 1786–1837". He also held visiting lectureships at Columbia University and the University of California at Berkeley. Active in scholarly exchanges, Ames served on the Administrative Board of the Institute of International Education, led the Council of National Defense Philadelphia host committee during the 1920 visit of a British educational mission to the city, and represented the University of Pennsylvania to the 1909 convention of the American Association of Universities. He was the commencement speaker during the 1923 graduation exercises at New Brunswick High School in New Brunswick, New Jersey, delivering an address titled "Preparing for Citizenship". During the 1925 University of Pennsylvania commencement exercises, Ames and John Carew Rolfe both received honorary Doctor of Letters degrees.

After 21 years as head of Pennsylvania's graduate school, Ames resigned his post in 1928 and was succeeded by the classicist H. Lamar Crosby. He continued his teaching duties until his death.

=== Writing and research ===
Ames' administrative and teaching duties were an ongoing encumbrance on his research activity, limiting him to a small, albeit influential, body of work.

==== The Proposed Amendments to the Constitution of the United States ====
Ames' 1897 monograph The Proposed Amendments to the Constitution of the United States During the First Century of Its History, which indexed 1,736 amendments proposed to the United States Constitution, was an expansion of his doctoral dissertation. According to Ames, he had returned from his travels in Europe too late in the year to find a teaching assignment and decided to spend the ensuing months writing and researching instead.

Ames' 400-page opus marked the first exhaustive catalog of proposed amendments to the U.S. Constitution ever compiled. Ames personally visited a large number of state and federal offices to record the details of the thousands of amending resolutions that had been proposed during the preceding hundred years. In discussing his research, Ames concluded that many of the amendments had failed as they were "cures for temporary evils ... were trivial or impracticable ... [or] found a place in that unwritten constitution that has grown up side by side with the written document". He also opined that the majorities required for ratification of amendments were so large as to create "insurmountable constitutional obstacles" to amendment, a frequent criticism leveled during the Progressive Era.

A review of the volume in the Annals of the American Academy of Political and Social Science concluded it was "a laborious and painstaking piece of work". The Proposed Amendments to the Constitution of the United States During the First Century of Its History earned Ames the American Historical Association's Justin Winsor Prize. It was reprinted in 1970.

==== Other works ====
Other works by Ames included John C. Calhoun and the Secession Movement of 1850, Slavery and the Union 1845–1861, and The X.Y.Z. Letters, the latter of which he authored with John Bach McMaster. Ames also edited a volume of State Documents on Federal Relations, a multi-issue compendium of state legislative documents pertaining to the U.S. government.

=== Archival preservation ===
At the turn of the 20th century, the American Historical Association (AHA) undertook a nationwide effort to examine repositories of manuscripts and archival documents, and make specific recommendations for their future preservation. The initiative was partly influenced by Ames' advocacy of German historical methodology, learned during his year in Europe, which placed special emphasis on primary documentary sources. At the behest of the AHA, Ames spent several weeks in Harrisburg in 1899, examining Pennsylvania's state records, which were poorly organized and largely scattered across various state offices. He co-authored, with historian Lewis Slifer Shimmel, a report on their status, and in 1900 filed a separate report on the state of the Philadelphia municipal archives. Their report concluded that over the years Pennsylvania's public records had been partially plundered by government officials with some state documents known to be held by libraries in New York and Boston, and others probably once bearing the original signature of William Penn had since had their signature lines cut out, perhaps for souvenir keeping. Ames continued his attempts to inventory Pennsylvania public records in tandem with his teaching duties at the University of Pennsylvania, although his efforts were hampered by the tradition that all state government offices closed promptly at 3 o'clock in the afternoon.

Ames and Shimmel ended their work with several recommendations. First, they advised that original manuscripts, where they could be found, be printed and bound to guarantee the preservation of their contents even if the original records became destroyed, lost, or stolen. Second, they called for storing documents in steel—rather than wooden—filing cabinets as a fireproofing measure. Finally, they called for the cataloging and centralization of important historical documents. In 1903, at the behest of Pennsylvania governor Samuel W. Pennypacker, himself a noted historian, Ames and Shimmel's recommendations were realized and the Pennsylvania State Archives formally established.

Ames continued his advocacy of archival preservation as a member of the AHA's Public Archives Commission, serving as its chair from 1903 to 1913, and continuing as a member for many years thereafter. By 1904, the commission had secured the services of historians in 32 states to study the status of public records and in 1907 Ames authored a detailed status report regarding archival preservation legislation throughout the United States, which would later be credited as the first report of its kind. Two years later, in 1909, Ames organized the first national conference of American government archivists.

With his well-established expertise on archival issues, J. Franklin Jameson called on Ames to give testimony to the United States Senate Committee on Public Buildings and Grounds as he lobbied for the creation of the National Archives of the United States. In February 1912, Jameson wrote Ames to ask him to "lay before the committee whatever there has been in the practice or experience of states that deserves attention by persons who are planning a national building". Ames' prior commitment to attend the quasquicentennial celebrations of the University of Pittsburgh ultimately prevented him from traveling to Washington for the hearing. Still, Jameson continued to correspond with Ames seeking advice relating to the politics and impediments he had experienced in advocating for the creation of state archives.

=== Professional societies ===
Ames served as corresponding secretary of the Historical Society of Pennsylvania, and was elected to the American Antiquarian Society. He also served as president of the History Teachers' Association of the Middle States and Maryland. In 1918 he was appointed—along with John Bach McMaster, Hampton Carson, William Cameron Sproul, and others—to the Pennsylvania War History Commission, which was formed to preserve records related to Pennsylvania's participation in World War I.

== Death ==
Ames had planned his retirement for 1936, and was intending to spend his final year at Pennsylvania laying the groundwork for two new research projects: a biography of Robert J. Walker, and a study of the presidential veto power.

Neither of Ames' two planned projects bore fruit; he died at his home at 203 St. Mark's Square in Philadelphia on February 7, 1935, from a cerebral hemorrhage following a stroke. Funeral services were held at the Second Presbyterian Church of Philadelphia, with Thomas Sovereign Gates, Roland S. Morris, Emory Richard Johnson, Conyers Read, Roy Franklin Nichols, Lewis M. Stevens, Julian P. Boyd, H. Lamar Crosby, and Edward Cheyney serving as honorary pallbearers.

On May 7, 1935, three months after his death, a memorial meeting was held at Houston Hall in which Ames was eulogized by his colleagues and former students. A record of these speeches, along with letters contributed by those who could not attend—including his doctoral supervisor Albert Bushnell Hart—was compiled and edited by Edward Cheyney and Roy Franklin Nichols. The compilation was published by the University of Pennsylvania Press in 1936 as the 31-page Memorial: Herman Vandenburg Ames.

== Personal life ==
Ames was unmarried. He had an older sister, Ella Elizabeth, who resided with him at the time of his death. His older brother, Marcus Judson, died in childhood.

In his personal mannerisms, it was said that Ames had a keen sense of humor and a relaxed disposition.

Ames' personal interests included music and travel. He was a member of the Order of the Founders and Patriots of America, serving as the society's fifteenth Governor-General from 1919 to 1921, and the Society of Mayflower Descendants. He served, for a time, as president of the Delta Upsilon Club of Philadelphia and as the international historian of Delta Upsilon. Ames was also a member of the Presbyterian polity.

== Recognition ==
=== Honors ===
- Justin Winsor Prize, American Historical Association (1897)
- Elected Member of the American Philosophical Society (1921)
- Honorary Doctor of Letters (Litt.D.), University of Pennsylvania (1925)
- Honorary Legum Doctor (LL.D.), LaSalle College (1927)

=== Legacy ===
Ames' portrait, by Alice L. Emmong, is cataloged in the United States National Portrait Collection. The Ella E. and Herman V. Ames Fund, established in 1951 through a bequest by Ames' sister, who left most of her estate to the University of Pennsylvania, supports the acquisition of materials in American history by the University of Pennsylvania library system. His papers are housed at the University of Pennsylvania's University Archives.

== Publications ==
=== Books ===
- Ames, Herman V. (1897). The Proposed Amendments to the Constitution of the United States During the First Century of Its History. Washington, District of Columbia: American Historical Society.
- Ames, Herman V. (1904). Slavery and the Constitution, 1789–1845. Philadelphia, Pennsylvania: University of Pennsylvania Press.
- Ames, Herman V. (1906). Slavery and the Union, 1845–1861. Philadelphia, Pennsylvania: University of Pennsylvania Press.
- Ames, Herman V. and McMaster, John B. (1912). X.Y.Z. Letters. Philadelphia, Pennsylvania: University of Pennsylvania Press.

=== Curricula guides ===
- Ames, Herman V. (1898). Outline of Lectures on American Political and Institutional History During the Colonial and Revolutionary Periods: With References for Collateral Reading. Philadelphia: University of Pennsylvania Press.
- Ames, Herman V. and Root, Winfred (1912). Syllabus of American Colonial History from the Beginning of Colonial Expansion to the Formation of the Federal Union. New York: Longmans, Green, and Co.

=== Journal articles ===
- Ames, Herman V. (October 1896). "A Committee of the Massachusetts Legislature on Additional Amendments to the Federal Constitution, 1790". American Historical Review. 2 (1): 99–105. doi:10.2307/1833618. JSTOR 1833618.
- Ames, Herman V. (April 1900). "Pennsylvania and the English Government, 1699–1704". Pennsylvania Magazine of History and Biography. 24 (1): 61–80. JSTOR 20085897.
- Ames, Herman V. (January 1924). "The Amending Provision of the Federal Constitution in Practice". Proceedings of the American Philosophical Society. 63 (1): 62–75. JSTOR 984442.
- Ames, Herman V. (March 1931). "The Public Career of Benjamin Franklin: A Life of Service". Pennsylvania Magazine of History and Biography. 55 (3): 61–80. JSTOR 20085897.
- Ames, Herman V. (April 1933). "Recent Development of the Amending Power as Applied to the Federal Constitution". Proceedings of the American Philosophical Society. 72 (2): 87–100. JSTOR 20086770.

=== Published lectures ===
- Ames, Herman V. (1921). "Dalmatia and Adjacent Lands of the Jugo-Slavs". (delivered to the University of Pennsylvania Free Public Lecture Course on April 7, 1920, and published in University Lectures Delivered by Members of the Faculty in the Free Public Lecture Course Volume 7 1919–1920).

=== Reports ===
- Ames, Herman V. (1898). "History of Delta Upsilon". (published in The Delta Upsilon: An Annual Containing the Records of the Sixty-fourth Annual Convention of the Delta Upsilon Fraternity)
- Ames, Herman V. and Shimmel, L.S. (1900). "Report on the Public Archives of Pennsylvania". (published in the Annual Report of the American Historical Association)
- Ames, Herman V. and McKinley, Albert. (1901). "Report on the Public Archives of the City and County of Philadelphia". (published in the Annual Report of the American Historical Association)
- Ames, Herman V. and Kelker, Luther. (1904). "List of the Contents of the Pennsylvania Archives". (published in the Annual Report of the American Historical Association)
- Ames, Herman V. (1906). "The Work of the Public Archives Commission". (published in the Annual Report of the American Historical Association)

== Notes ==
Academic offices
Preceded by Clarence G. Child	Dean of the University of Pennsylvania; Graduate School; 1907–1928	Succeeded by Henry Lamar Crosby
