= Justin Winsor Prize =

Justin Winsor Prize may refer to:

- Justin Winsor Prize (history), a prize awarded by the American Historical Association, 1896–1938
- Justin Winsor Prize (library), a prize awarded by the Library History Round Table of the American Library Association, established in 1978
