= George Cockburn Henderson =

Australian historian

George Cockburn Henderson (1 May 1870 – c. 9 April 1944) was an Australian academic with a considerable career in Adelaide.

== History ==
Cockburn was born in Hamilton, New South Wales, the eighth of nine children of Richard T. Henderson (c. 1830–1897) and was educated at Hamilton and Lawrence public schools. He passed the public instruction examination at age 13 and was admitted to Macquarie Superior Public School as a pupil teacher under his brother Richard Henderson. In December 1889 he won a £72 per annum scholarship to the Fort Street Training College. He matriculated the following March and in so doing won two-years' free tuition at Sydney University, later extended by another year.

He graduated BA in March 1893, winning a gold medal in philosophy, the Fraser Scholarship in History, and the James King of Irrawang Travelling Scholarship of £110 for two years, and in 1894 he enrolled at Balliol College, Oxford, where he was awarded a Brackenbury Scholarship in history which funded his studies there to the value of £80 per annum for five years. He also excelled at athletics and was a leading oarsman and member of the Balliol crew at the Henley and Oxford races. He graduated MA and was employed in various parts of England as a University extension lecturer. In recognition of his highly successful work, he was promoted by the Oxford extension delegacy to first-class lecturer.

In 1898 he accepted a position at Sydney University as Acting Professor of History, while Professor Wood was on holiday in England. On 5 January 1899, two days before leaving, he married May Gertrude Sturge, a niece of John Bright and of Joseph Sturge, at the Friends' Meeting Place, Leicester, England. They arrived in Sydney aboard the P & O steamer Oceana in late February. A second acting Professorship, of Philosophy, arose at Sydney University, which Henderson filled, in 1900 returning to England, living at Kingham, and at Charlbury, in Oxfordshire, the home of his wife's parents.

Early in 1902 Henderson was invited to give a course of lectures in Sydney, and while he was in Australia Professor Douglas peremptorily resigned, and the University of Adelaide offered him the chair of History (or perhaps his friend William Mitchell, professor of English and Philosophy, persuaded him to apply); he accepted and took up residence in North Adelaide. He attempted to persuade his wife to join him, but she repeatedly declined. By 1910 she was living with the newspaper editor Richard Henry Gretton, and Henderson instituted divorce proceedings. Henderson was spending much of his spare time at the Adelaide Club.

In 1921 Mrs G. A. Jury made a bequest to the university, which enabled Henderson's dual responsibilities to be divided: A. T. Strong was appointed to the Jury professorship of English Literature in 1922, and Henderson retained the Professorship of Modern History. On 27 October 1922 Henderson married Dr. Annie Heloise Abel (1873–1947), an English-born Professor of History in America, with an interest in American colonial history. They settled on a rural property at Blackwood, but she was unhappy; he suffered a nervous breakdown and was hospitalised in June 1923 and insisted she leave him; they divorced on the grounds of incompatibility. Henderson's resignation from the university was accepted reluctantly and he was awarded the title of professor emeritus.

He moved to Dora Creek, New South Wales in 1923. He continued his historical researches; notably on Abel Tasman with M. Wieder, the Dutch historian.

He was cared for over the course of 20 years by his niece Elsie Henderson, who lived next door to his "cozy villa". When the pair visited England in 1936 he arranged for Elsie to be presented to the court of King Edward VIII (later Duke of Windsor). Henderson was depressed and his life was complete after completing a book. Elsie found him on 9 April 1944 near the road on his property, throat slit, with a razor under his body.

== Other activities ==
- He represented the university on the Board of Governors of the Public Library. Art Gallery, and Museum
- He was chairman of the library committee and the archives department, which opened in 1920, and owed much of its early success to his insistence that wherever possible archive material should be donated rather than purchased.
- He gave a large number of public lectures in Adelaide, and in Perth May–June 1906, 1907 and 1908, to packed and appreciative houses. He was a powerful advocate for establishment of a university in Western Australia.
- He was a supporter of the Literary Societies movement and the South Australian Literary Societies' Union, of which he was president in 1906.

== Publications ==
- Henderson, G. C. Sir George Grey; Pioneer of Empire in Southern Lands Dent & Co., of London (1907)
- Henderson, G. C. Fiji and the Fijians 1835–1856'
- Henderson, G. C., Thomas Williams The journal of Thomas Williams, missionary in Fiji, 1840-1853, Volume 1 Angus & Robertson (1931)
- Henderson, G. C. The discoverers of the Fiji Islands: Tasman, Cook, Bligh, Wilson, Bellinghausen J. Murray, (1933)

== Recognition ==
- He left the bulk of his estate to the University of Sydney to fund the G. C. Henderson research scholarship, studying the South Pacific islands.
- The Henderson room at the History Department at the University of Adelaide, which carries much of his library, was named for him.
