= Mamie Gwinn Hodder =

American educator (1860–1940)

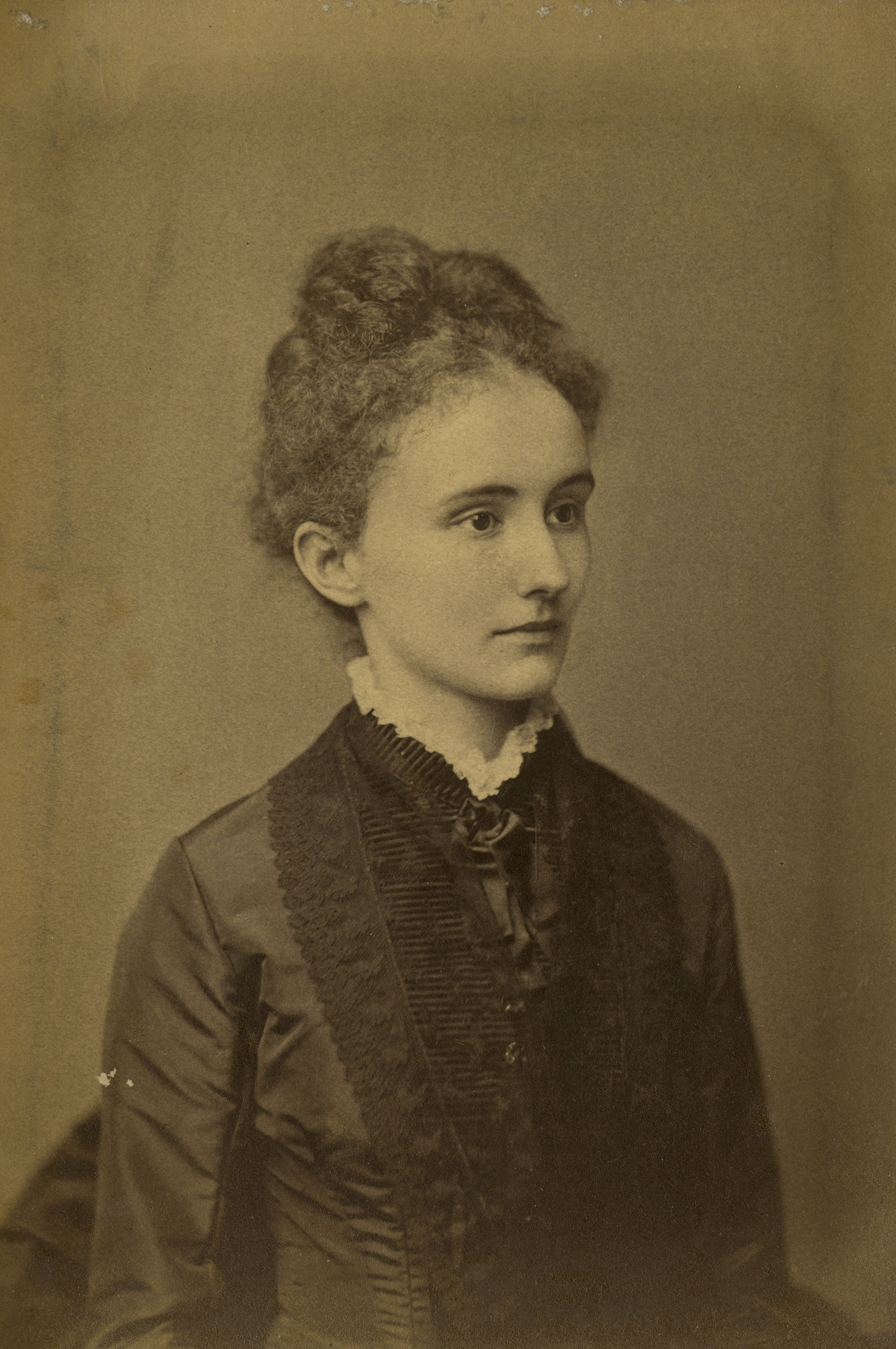
- Born: Mary Mackall Gwinn; February 2, 1860; Baltimore, Maryland
- Died: November 11, 1940 (aged 80); Princeton, New Jersey
- Occupation: Educator
- Spouse: Alfred Hodder (1904–1907)
- Partner: M. Carey Thomas (1880s–1904)
- Relatives: Reverdy Johnson (grandfather); John Johnson Sr. (great-grandfather); William R. Travers (uncle)

Mary Mackall "Mamie" Gwinn Hodder (February 2, 1860 – November 11, 1940) was an American educator. She taught at Bryn Mawr College, and was one of the founders of the Bryn Mawr School in Baltimore. Her relationships with M. Carey Thomas and Alfred Hodder were fictionalized in Gertrude Stein's short novel Fernhurst (1905).

== Early life and education ==
Gwinn was born in Baltimore, the daughter of Charles John Morris Gwinn and Matilda Elizabeth Bowie Johnson Gwinn. Her father was a lawyer associated with Johns Hopkins University. Her maternal grandfather, Reverdy Johnson, was a senator, an ambassador, and United States Attorney General.

Gwinn was the youngest founding member of the "Friday Night Club", a women's study group in Baltimore, together with Mary Elizabeth Garrett, Julia Rebecca Rogers, Bessie Tabor King, and M. Carey Thomas. The members founded the Bryn Mawr School in 1885, and ensured that women would be admitted to the medical school at Johns Hopkins in the 1890s.

Gwinn and Thomas traveled and studied together in Europe from 1879 to 1883, in Leipzig and Zurich. Gwinn was granted a doctoral degree from Bryn Mawr in 1888.

== Career ==
Gwinn taught English literature at Bryn Mawr College, and worked on a translation of Beowulf, until she married a male colleague, writer Alfred Hodder, and moved to New York City.

== Personal life and legacy ==
Gwinn was the partner of M. Carey Thomas for over 20 years. They lived together in the Deanery at Bryn Mawr, from the 1880s until 1904, when Gwinn married Alfred Hodder, former common-law husband of activist Jessie Donaldson Hodder, and moved to New York City. He died in 1907. Mamie Gwinn Hodder died in 1940, at the age of 80, in Princeton, New Jersey.

The romantic entanglements of Thomas, Gwinn, Mary Elizabeth Garrett and the Hodders are fictionalized in Gertrude Stein's short novel Fernhurst (1905). The Mary Mackall Gwinn Hodder Fund at Princeton University supports graduate students in the arts. Princeton also holds the Alfred and Mary Gwinn Hodder Papers.
