= Arthur Charles Cole =

American historian

Arthur C. Cole
- Born: 22 April 1886; Ann Arbor, Michigan, U.S.
- Died: 26 February 1976 (aged 89); Naples, Florida, U.S.
- Occupation: Historian

Academic background
- Education: University of Michigan (BA); University of Pennsylvania (PhD)
- Doctoral advisor: Herman Vandenburg Ames

Academic work
- Institutions: University of Illinois; Ohio State University; Brooklyn College
- Doctoral students: William B. Hesseltine

Arthur Cole (April 22, 1886 - February 26, 1976) was an American historian. He specialized in the history of the American Civil War and taught at several universities over the course of his career, including University of Illinois (1912 to 1920), Ohio State University (1920 to 1930), Western Reserve University (1930 to 1944), and finally Brooklyn College, where he served as Chair of the History Department from 1950 to 1956 and retired as professor emeritus.

Cole was born April 22, 1886, in Ann Arbor, Michigan. He attended the University of Michigan, where received his bachelor's degree in 1907. He then enrolled at the University of Pennsylvania, where he studied under Professor Herman Vandenburg Ames. He received his doctorate in 1911.

Cole's first monograph, The Whig Party in the South, won the Justin Winsor Prize of the American Historical Association in 1912. Cole's speech regarding Lincoln's House Divided Speech was published by the University of Chicago Press in 1923. His third book, titled Irrepressible Conflict, 1850-65, was a social, economic, and cultural history of the Civil War and was published by Macmillan Publishers in 1934.

Over the course of his career, Cole was prominent in the American Association of University Professors, as well as the American Civil Liberties Union. He also served as president of the Mississippi Historical Association and managing editor of the Mississippi Valley Historical Review.

== Books ==
- The Whig Party In The South (London: Oxford University Press, 1913).
- The Era of the Civil War, 1848-1870 (Chicago: A. C. McClurg, 1922).
- Lincoln's House Divided Speech: Did It Reflect a Doctrine of Class Struggle? - An Address Delivered Before The Chicago Historical Society On March 15, 1923, 36 pages, (Chicago: University of Chicago Press, 1923).
- The Irrepressible Conflict, 1850-1865 (New York: Macmillan Publishers, 1934).
