= Orfa Jean Shontz =

American lawyer (1876–1954)

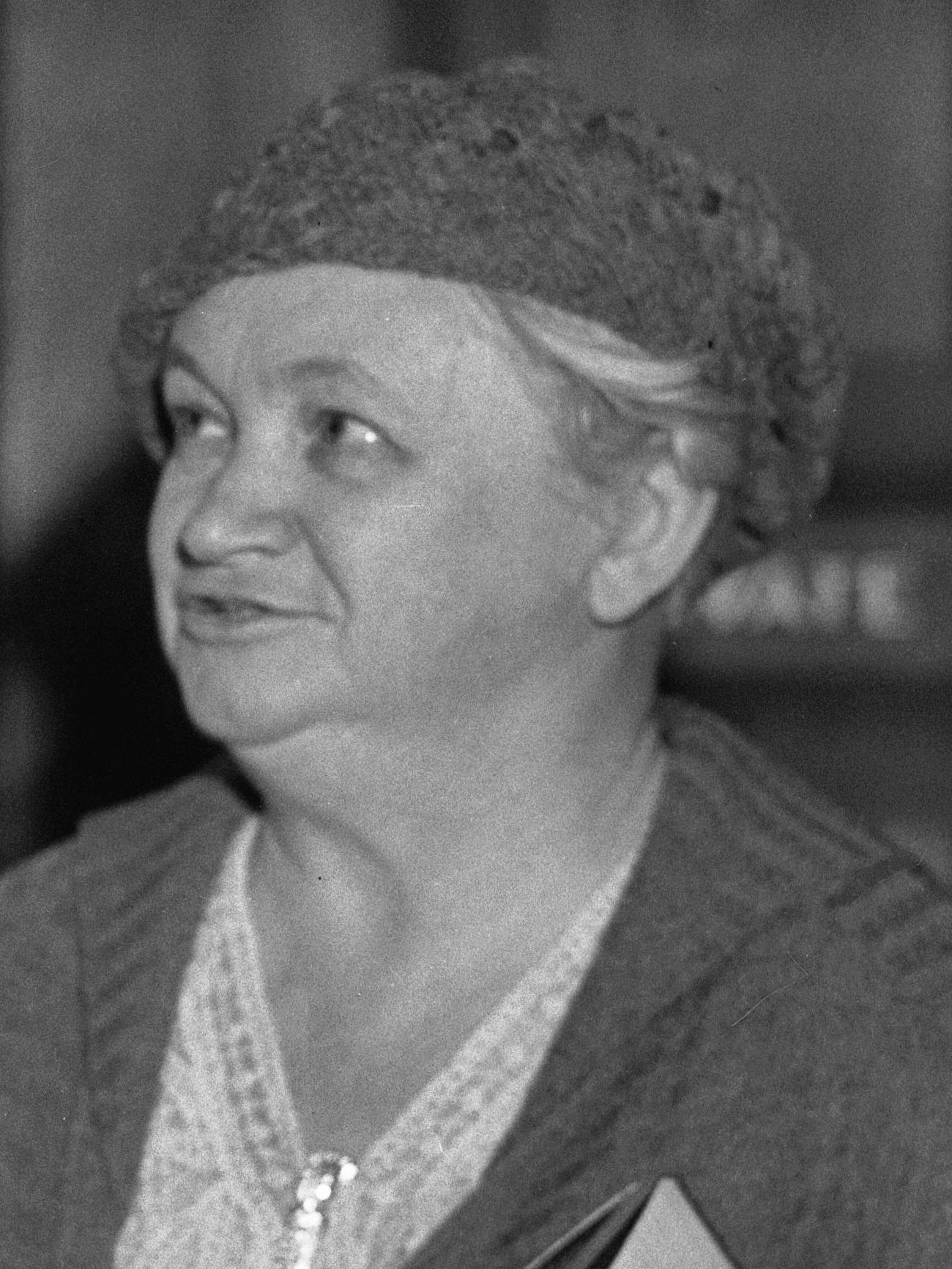
- Shontz in 1935

Personal details
- Born: November 1, 1876 Avoca, Iowa, U.S.
- Died: May 6, 1954 (aged 77)
- Resting place: Inglewood Park Cemetery, Inglewood, California, U.S.
- Party: Democratic
- Education: Ames College; University of Southern California
- Occupation: Attorney, judge

Orfa Jean Shontz (November 1, 1876 – May 6, 1954) was an American attorney and Municipal Judge. She was the first female referee of the Juvenile Court of Los Angeles County. She was the first female in California to "sit on the bench and administer justice".

== Early life ==
Orfa Jean Shontz was born on November 1, 1876, in Avoca, Iowa, the daughter of Benjamin Biehn Shontz and Jean Anderson Collins. She was the seventh of eight children. Her father was born in Plattsville, Ontario, Canada and was of German Mennonite descent. Her mother was born in Waterloo, Ontario, Canada and was of Scottish descent.

She graduated from Ames College (now Iowa State University) in Iowa. She moved to California in 1911. She studied law at the University of Southern California.

== Career ==
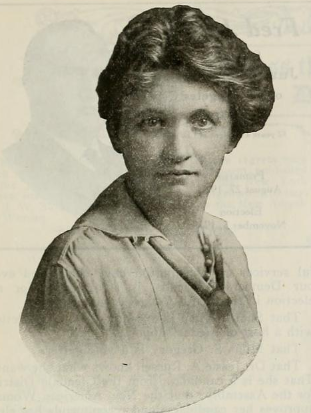
Shontz c. 1918

From 1911 to 1914, while still a law student, she became one of the first female probation officers of the Los Angeles County Juvenile Court.

She was admitted to the bar in 1913, one year before her graduation. She was a practicing attorney by 1913. Her office was at 1030 Citizen's National Bank Building in Los Angeles, California. From 1914 to 1915 she was secretary to the Los Angeles County Probate Court.

From 1915 to 1920 she was woman's department referee of the Juvenile Court of Los Angeles County; she was the first female referee of the Los Angeles Juvenile Court. She created an all-female court, with a homelike atmosphere, to make women feel comfortable, and especially girls involved in sex cases to have the privacy she felt they were entitled to. In 1918 she was a primary candidate for the Los Angeles County Superior Court election. When she resigned from the Juvenile Court in 1920, her position was taken over by Miriam Van Waters, her close friend.

In 1920 she was named City Clerk of Los Angeles but resigned soon to enter private law practice. In 1932 she was named deputy city attorney. In 1934 she won the general election in California for the State Board of Equalization District 4 for the Democratic Party, 48.3% against 47%, serving a four-year term. She was the first woman to serve on this board, which is charged with tax administration for the state.

On December 13, 1935, Governor Frank Merriam appointed her to a vacancy on the Municipal Court. From 1935 to 1947 she was Municipal Judge of the Los Angeles Municipal Court. In April 1941, First Lady Eleanor Roosevelt sat in with her on her bench in her courtroom.

== Memberships ==
Shontz sat on the board of directors of the Woman's Athletic Club. She was also president of the Business and Professional Woman's Club and a member of the board of managers of the Los Angeles Business Girls' Club. She held memberships in the Artland Club, P.E.O. Sisterhood, Woman Lawyers' Club, State Bar Association, Los Angeles League of Women Voters, and Phi Delta Delta.

== Personal life ==
Shontz moved to California in 1911. In the 1920s Shontz, Van Waters, Van Waters' friends Sara Fisher and Emily "Pole" Reynolds, a teacher of psychology at the University of California, Los Angeles, and Elizabeth "Bess" Woods, founder of the educational-research department for the Los Angeles Board of Education, all lived in a group of residences called the Colony, between Los Angeles and Pasadena. When the Colony burned down, Van Waters, Woods, and Shontz rented a house in Glendale that they called the "Stone House". At the time of her death, Shontz was living at 3518 Carnation Avenue, Los Angeles.

She died on May 6, 1954, aged 77, and is buried at Inglewood Park Cemetery.
