= Marcus Ames =

American minister and school administrator

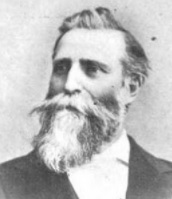
- Born: 1828
- Died: 1887 (aged 58–59)
- Citizenship: United States
- Occupation: Minister
- Title: Reverend
- Spouse: Jane Ames (née Vandenburg)
- Relatives: Herman Vandenburg Ames (son)
- Family: Ames family

Marcus Ames (1828–1887) was an American minister and prison chaplain who was an early reformer in juvenile corrections. A member of the Ames family, he served as head of the Lancaster Industrial School for Girls and as chaplain of the state institutions of Rhode Island.

== Early life ==
A member of the Ames family, Marcus Ames was the son of Azel Ames and Mercy Ames (née Hatch). He was educated at Phillips Andover Academy, where he graduated as valedictorian, before studying medicine at Harvard Medical School.

== Career ==
He was ordained to the clergy in 1854, becoming a "brilliant, fervent, and impressive" Congregational preacher who ministered throughout Massachusetts. Though Ames was educated to undertake missionary work in West Africa, the poor state of health of his wife ultimately precluded him from traveling abroad.

Ames was a firm believer in criminal rehabilitation and, in 1862, was made superintendent and chaplain of the Lancaster Industrial School for Girls. Two years later he expressed, in writing, his concerns for what he saw as a growing problem with a lack of skilled education, and prevalence of idleness, among working class girls, and opined that without education many would be destined for unemployment and homelessness. In 1874, after plans were announced to install workshops at the school, Ames – concerned that the new direction towards prison industry was transforming it into a jail – resigned in protest. His resignation was joined by most of the school's matrons. After leaving the Lancaster School, he was appointed chaplain of state institutions of the State of Rhode Island, which included the state's insane asylum, prison, almshouse, and workhouse.

== Personal life ==
With his wife, Jane Ames (née Vandenburg), Ames had two sons, Marcus and Herman, and a daughter, Ella.
