= Miriam Van Waters =

American prison reformer (1887–1974)

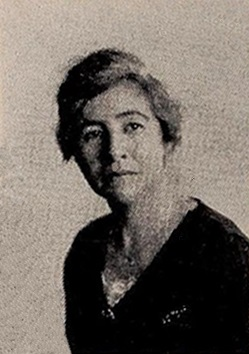
- Born: October 4, 1887; Greensburg, Pennsylvania, U.S.
- Died: January 17, 1974 (aged 86); Framingham, Massachusetts, U.S.
- Education: University of Oregon, Clark University
- Known for: Prison reform
- Children: Sarah Ann (adopted)

Miriam Van Waters (October 4, 1887 – January 17, 1974) was an American prison reformer of the early to mid-20th century whose methods owed much to her upbringing as an Episcopalian involved in the Social Gospel movement. During her career as a penologist, which spanned most of the years from 1914 through 1957, she served as superintendent of three prisons: Frazier Detention Home for boys and girls in Portland, Oregon; Los Angeles County Juvenile Hall for girls, and the Massachusetts Correctional Institution – Framingham, then called the Massachusetts Reformatory for Women. While in California, Van Waters established an experimental reformatory school, El Retiro, for girls age 14 to 19. In each case, Van Waters developed programs that favored education, work, recreation, and a sense of community over unalloyed incarceration and punishment.

Born in Pennsylvania, she grew up in Portland after her father, a clergyman and Social Gospel advocate, accepted a position there as rector of St. David's Episcopalian Church. As the eldest daughter of an ailing mother, she often served as a surrogate mother, as she did later as a supervisor of imprisoned women and children. After graduating from secondary school, Van Waters attended the University of Oregon, majoring at first in philosophy and graduating in 1910 with a master's degree in psychology. Three years later, at Clark University in Worcester, Massachusetts, she completed a doctorate in anthropology.

Van Waters' public-speaking skills, assertive manner, and charisma drew national as well as local attention to her methods, and she was supported financially by philanthropists including Ethel Sturges Dummer, who helped pay for El Retiro and for leaves of absence from her supervisory duties to work on two books, Youth in Conflict (1925) and Parents on Probation (1927). Another wealthy philanthropist, Geraldine Morgan Thompson, supported Van Waters financially and emotionally from the mid-1920s until Thompson's death in 1967. Eleanor Roosevelt, a first lady, and Felix Frankfurter, a Harvard law professor and then a Supreme Court justice, were among Van Waters' many admirers and political supporters, but her methods drew the ire of opponents who viewed them as over-lenient and ineffective. Opposition in Los Angeles led to her departure from California in 1932 and to much-publicized hearings in Massachusetts after she was fired as Framingham superintendent in January 1949. Re-instated in March, she continued running the reformatory until 1957. After retiring, she remained in the town of Framingham, living in a woman-centered household, as she had often done, until her death in 1974.

== Early life ==
Miriam Van Waters was born in 1887 in Greensburg, Pennsylvania. Her parents, George Browne and Maude Vosburg Van Waters, were from middle-class families from Rensselaer Falls, New York, in George's case and Dubois, Pennsylvania, in Maud's. After studying at Oberlin College, George attended Bexley Hall, an Episcopal seminary from which he received a divinity degree in 1883. In 1884 in Dubois, the site of his first posting as a clergyman, George met and married Maud. Their first child, Rachel, was born in 1885, the year the family moved to Greensburg. Rachel died there at age 2 and, in the same year, Miriam was born. In 1891, the family moved again, this time to George's new posting as rector of St. David's Episcopal Church in Portland, Oregon.

Miriam, as the eldest daughter, helped her mother with housekeeping and with the care of younger siblings, of which there were three more—Ruth, Rebekah, and George—by 1896 and another, Ralph, in 1905. Her mother, in failing health, often retreated to the Oregon coast or to her parents' home in Pennsylvania, leaving Miriam in charge of the household. During these growing-up years, Miriam was strongly influenced by her father's love of books and scholarship, his participation in the Social Gospel movement, and his use of the rectory as a kind of settlement house open to everyone. She attended St. Helen's Hall, an Episcopal girls' school, for her secondary education, graduating in 1904. Remaining at St. Helen's for another year as a post-graduate student, she left Portland for the University of Oregon in Eugene in 1905.

=== University education: 1905–1913 ===
The university, about 150 miles (240 km) south of Portland, had a total enrollment of only about 500. Van Waters excelled academically, majoring in philosophy and focusing on courses related to progressive ideas, feminism, public service, and politics. Her senior thesis was titled "The Relation of Philosophical Materialism to Social Radicalism". She served on student committees, joined the women's debate team, and became chief editor of the Oregon Monthly, a campus literary magazine. (Note: Louise Bryant, a University of Oregon student who later became a widely known journalist, was among the contributors to the magazine. Van Waters praised Bryant's creativity but disapproved of her "drinking, smoking, and flashy dressing.") As a graduate student, she majored in psychology and was the teaching assistant for one of her professors, Henry D. Sheldon. Her master's thesis focused on philosophical materialism and social progress. In 1910, she was awarded a fellowship at Clark University in Worcester, Massachusetts, to pursue a doctorate in psychology under the guidance of G. Stanley Hall, a specialist in child psychology and education.

Van Waters admired Hall's intellect and use of quantitative data but resisted his focus on genetics as the component of adolescent psychology most worthy of study. She preferred the interventionist approach of social reformers, especially Jane Addams, in the lives of troubled teen-agers. In her third year at Clark, she changed advisors, from Hall to Alexander Chamberlain, an anthropologist who favored cultural rather than genetic explanations for adolescent behavior. Her dissertation, The Adolescent Girl among Primitive People, was influenced by Chamberlain's cross-cultural studies and her personal investigations of juvenile delinquency in Boston and in her home town, Portland. She graduated from Clark in 1913 with a Ph.D. in anthropology.

== West Coast career ==
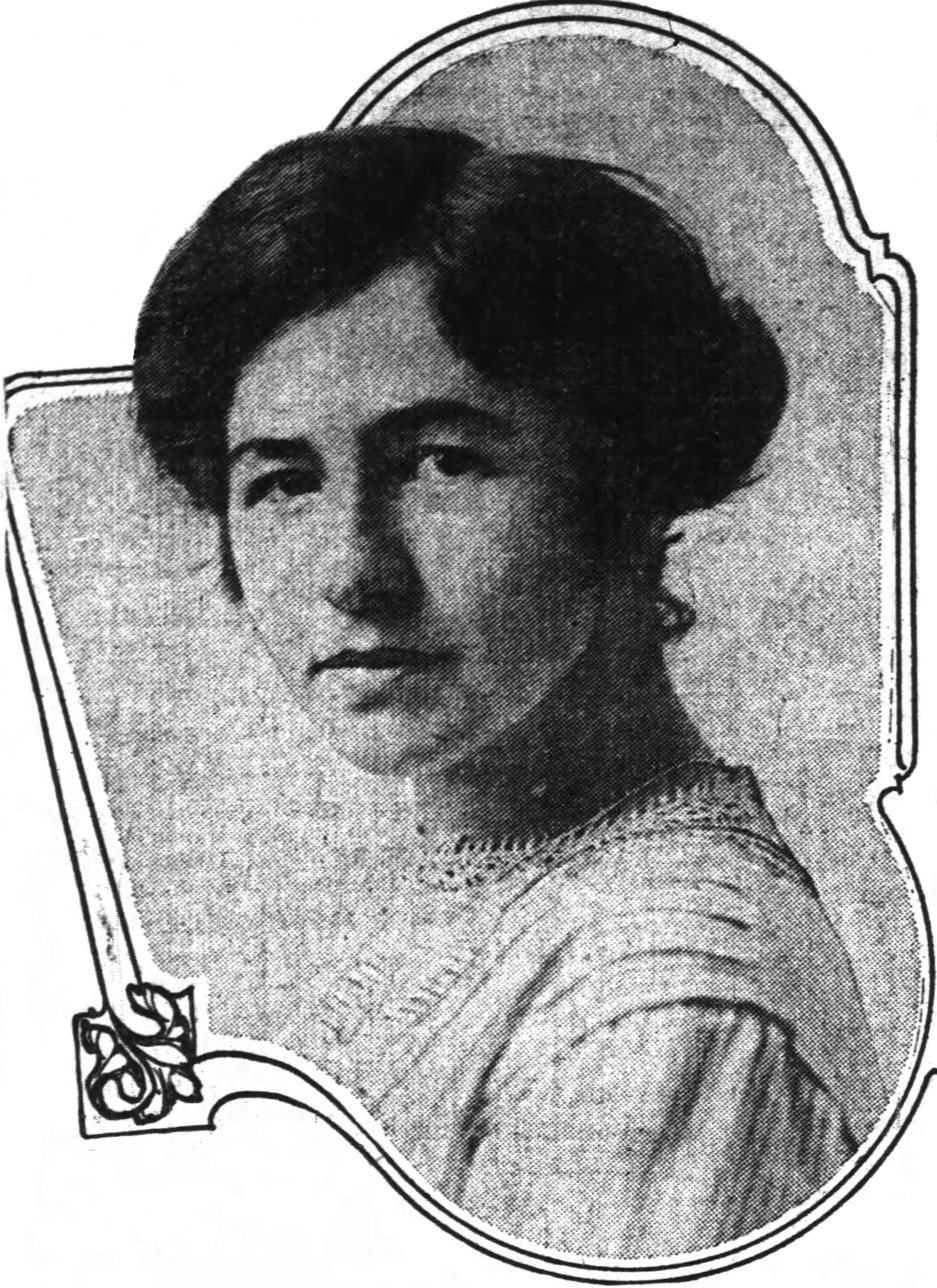
Miriam Van Waters on May 1, 1914, the day she became superintendent of the Frazer Detention Home in Portland

=== Portland: 1914–1917 ===
After a brief stint with the Boston Children's Aid Society (BCAS) as a probation officer for girls awaiting trial or sentencing in juvenile court, Van Waters applied for work in Portland. She returned there in 1914 to become superintendent of the Frazer Detention Home, the poor condition of which was of concern to the Multnomah County Juvenile Court. The detention center held boys and girls who, while in custody, were fed a poor diet, received scant medical attention, were given little to do, and were subjected to corporal punishment with straps and rubber hoses. During her short tenure, Van Waters recruited volunteer medical doctors and a volunteer psychologist, hired a resident nurse, improved the children's diet, added a library, put the children to work cleaning, painting, and gardening, and banned corporal punishment. Her stay at Frazer ended abruptly in late 1914, when fatigue followed by a diagnosis of tuberculosis made it impossible for her to continue. (Note: In 1954, the City of Portland converted the Frazer Detention Home site into a 3.9-acre (1.6 ha) public recreation area, Frazer Park.)

She recuperated over the next three years, first at a property owned by her family near Cannon Beach, Oregon, then as an inpatient and later an outpatient at Pottenger Sanatorium near Pasadena, California. Her attempts during these years to start a second career as a writer of fiction, nonfiction, and poetry did not succeed. Despite health concerns, she took and passed a California civil service exam, then applied for the position of superintendent at the Los Angeles County Juvenile Hall, a detention center for girls. She began work there in August 1917.

=== Los Angeles: 1917–1931 ===
Assisted by many other women reformers, she worked to modify the detention center to include health care, counseling, psychological assessment, improved diet, recreation, and other social services. In 1919, she founded El Retiro, an experimental school for girls aged 14 to 19 chosen from among those sent to Juvenile Hall. The school, kept unlocked in a rural setting outside Los Angeles, favored education, work, and recreation as opposed to incarceration and punishment as antidotes to juvenile delinquency. According to journalist Adela Rogers St. Johns, El Retiro stood in sharp contrast to many early 20th-century prisons for women and children, where conditions were "foul, fetid and medieval". After meeting social reformer Mary Bartelme at Jane Addam's Hull House in 1921, Van Waters promoted the idea of a Los Angeles halfway house for women who had graduated from El Retiro and needed a safe place to stay while looking for work. Partly funded by Chicago philanthropist Ethel Sturges Dummer, the halfway house opened later in 1921 and over the rest of the decade served several hundred young women, each staying an average of four months. From 1920 through 1929, Van Waters, succeeding Orfa Jean Shontz, served as a court-appointed referee presiding over hearings about cases involving boys and girls younger than 12.

According to historian Estelle Freedman, Van Waters' career advancement in the Los Angeles juvenile justice system of the 1920s depended partly on her personal charisma and public-speaking skills, partly on a network of academic, legal, and social-service professionals, and partly on reform networks exemplified by women's clubs such as the Friday Morning Club. She gave frequent lectures about child welfare and juvenile justice to clubs, parent-teacher associations, and church-affiliated welfare groups, and wrote a series of articles about the juvenile court for the Evening Herald.

Between 1917 and 1927, Van Waters lived with other women in a residential complex known as the Colony. Among the residents during at least some of these years were her sister Rebekah, her long-time friends Sara Fisher and Elizabeth (Bess) Woods, and Shontz,. Philanthropists such as Dummer, social reformers including Grace Abbott, Edith Abbott, and Sophonisba Breckinridge; psychiatrist Adolf Meyer, and prison reformer George W. Kirchwey spent time at the Colony when they visited Los Angeles. Shontz convinced Dummer to award a grant to Van Waters to undertake a national survey of women's penal institutions across the United States; taking a leave of absence from her work in Los Angeles, Van Waters began the survey in late 1920. Results were published in 1922 as "Where Girls Go Right: Some Dynamic Aspects of State Correctional Schools for Girls and Young Women" in The Survey, a leading social service journal. Financed by Dummer, Van Waters took other leaves of absence during the 1920s to widely promote her ideas about child welfare and prison reform, citing El Retiro as a model.

With further help from Dummer, she was able to complete a book, Youth in Conflict (1925), detailing her juvenile-delinquency theories and supporting them with examples from court cases. The well-received and financially successful book helped establish Van Waters' national reputation. In 1926, Felix Frankfurter, a Harvard Law School professor and later a Supreme Court justice, found Van Waters' book impressive and asked her to manage the juvenile delinquency fraction of the Harvard Crime Survey, which sought to determine the causes of crime and the best methods of prevention. In 1928, she completed a second book, Parents on Probation, which repeated her assertions that juvenile delinquency stemmed from families that failed to provide children with adequate attention and positive role models. In 1929, she was elected president of the National Conference of Social Work, the first woman from the western part of the United States to win the organization's top post.

While Van Waters' reputation grew nationally during the 1920s, it declined in Los Angeles County among voters and politicians who preferred methods more punitive than those favored by Van Waters. By 1927, the probation committee, a seven-member group appointed by the county supervisors had become so hostile to Van Waters' methods that it fired Alma Holzschuh, the El Retiro supervisor favored by Van Waters, and replaced her with one more to their liking. Soon thereafter, policemen were used to control the students. Distraught by her loss of control over El Retiro and encouraged by her professional opportunities elsewhere, she planned a permanent move to the northeastern United States. Her parents had by then relocated from Portland to Wellsboro, Pennsylvania; the Harvard Crime Survey, with headquarters in Cambridge, Massachusetts, was unfinished, and in November 1929 Van Waters agreed to direct the juvenile-delinquency division of the Wickersham Commission, formally titled the National Committee on Law Observance and Enforcement, established by President Herbert Hoover. In that same year, she became the legal guardian of seven-year-old Betty Jean Martin, a ward of the juvenile court whom she renamed Sarah Ann Van Waters. After taking a leave of absence in late 1929 to join Hoover's commission in January 1930, Van Waters formally resigned from the Los Angeles juvenile court in late 1930.

During the latter half of the decade, Van Waters entered what was to be a strong, eventually intimate 40-year relationship with another wealthy philanthropist, Geraldine Morgan Thompson, who supported prison reform in her home state of New Jersey and elsewhere. Encouraged by Thompson, Dummer, and Frankfurter, Van Waters relocated to Cambridge in 1931. In that same year, publication of her 175-page Wickersham Commission report, The Child Offender in the Federal System of Justice, enhanced her reputation as an expert on juvenile justice. After declining a job offer from Pennsylvania Governor Gifford Pinchot, as an administrator in the state welfare department, she learned in November that she would soon be offered the position of superintendent at the Massachusetts Reformatory for Women at Framingham, replacing Jessie Donaldson Hodder, who had recently died.

== East Coast career ==
=== Early years at Framingham: 1932–1948 ===
In March 1932, Van Waters began her new job at Framingham, where she served as superintendent for the next quarter-century. From the time of its opening in 1877, the reformatory had incorporated progressive ideas about how women's prisons should function. Framingham, governed by women, included a resident physician and a resident chaplain, both of whom were women, and a system of day work for inmates who could be trusted outside the prison. Most of the inmates were serving time for prostitution, extramarital sex, "crimes against chastity", alcoholism, and other offenses known at the time as "crimes against public order", which in some cases included being homeless or being a "stubborn child". She emphasized rehabilitation rather than punishment, referred to the prison population as students rather than inmates or prisoners, relaxed the dress code, encouraged the women to talk to one another and to staff members, brought in guest speakers such as Frankfurter, Thompson, Dummer, Robert Frost, Eleanor Roosevelt, and Margaret Mead, and expanded the women's freedom of movement within the prison and outside its walls. Federal funds made possible the construction in the mid-1930s of two cottages separate from the main reformry; Hodder Hall housed inmates between the ages of 17 and 21, and Jessie Wilson Sayre Cottage housed up to 30 mothers and their babies. A nursery inside the prison accommodated up to 60 more babies whose mothers lived in the main building rather than in a cottage. A donor base of women philanthropists, including Thompson, provided funding for social welfare workers and internships, psychiatric staff, and individual financial emergencies not covered by government funds.

For eight hours a day, the inmates made clothing and flags at the reformatory for the state or worked in the prison kitchens and its farm unit, and Van Waters supplemented the required work with voluntary educational courses in arts and crafts, literature, theater, singing, journalism, hiking, and how to live after parole. A typical number of course offerings during Van Waters' tenure was 26 or more, according to Dominique T. Chlup, a professor of adult education at Texas A&M University. Van Waters expanded an indenture program that under Hodder had allowed trusted inmates to work outside the prison as household domestics, kitchen helpers, hospital maids, and laundresses before returning to prison at night. To these, Van Waters added positions in local business and industry that needed workers, such as shoemakers, with a variety of skills. These changes displeased members of the state parole board, who viewed indenture as a way to circumvent their authority. Since the parole board members as well as Van Waters' immediate supervisor, the commissioner of corrections, were appointed by the governor, Van Waters' ability to run the reformatory as she wanted depended, as it had at El Retiro, on politics.

From 1932 through 1945, Van Waters' had sufficient political support for her methods, but that support waned after World War II. After the death of President Franklin D. Roosevelt in 1945, a conservative backlash against New Deal policies was accompanied by campaigns to portray liberals such as Van Waters as subversives who undermined the traditional social order. Van Water's resistance to authority, her use of indenture to place female prisoners in jobs that others might want, and her woman-centered personal life made her vulnerable to such reproach. In 1948, Elliot McDowell, the newly appointed commissioner of corrections, and his deputy, Frank Dwyer, began an investigation that focused on alleged homosexuality at the reformatory. Dwyer, a former state policeman, sought evidence to confirm rumors that a Framingham inmate whose death had been reported as a suicide, had been murdered by a jealous lesbian. Dwyer concluded that the rumors were false, but his interrogations of staff and inmates led to broader charges of lesbian activity at Framingham, and he leaked details about his probe to the tabloid press in Boston. Van Waters, who distinguished between supportive romantic relationships between women and predatory sexual aggression, did not consider herself to be a lesbian. Dwyer made no such distinction, and to prevent him or others from reading her private letters, Van Waters burned most of her 22-year correspondence with Thompson in June 1948.

=== Crisis: 1948–1949 ===
In response to Dwyer's report, in June 1948 McDowell reduced Van Waters' authority, and the state legislature established an investigative committee to hold hearings on the matter after the 1948 elections in November. During the summer and fall, State Senator Michael Lopresti, Van Waters' most vocal detractor on the committee, likened her methods to those of communist regimes that ruled with an "iron hand", and he denounced her administration as "more damaging to the morals and mental health of young girls" than prostitution. Meanwhile, Van Waters' allies created Friends of the Framingham Reformatory, a committee that raised funds for Van Waters's defense and hired Claude Cross, a Harvard-trained lawyer, as chief counsel. An initial public hearing in November resolved nothing, and in December McDowell announced his intention to fire Van Waters in January, when office-holders, including a new governor, began their terms. This threat led to widespread statements of support for Van Waters by a variety of organizations such as Americans for Democratic Action, the Women's City Club of Boston, the Massachusetts Council of Churches, the Massachusetts Association of Social Hygiene, and individuals such as Eleanor Roosevelt. On January 7, 1949, McDowell, listing 27 charges against her, fired Van Waters effective January 11. Van Waters, denying the charges, cited her legal right to an appeal, which McDowell granted.

The subsequent hearing, for which McDowell was the judge as well as one of the examiners, began on January 13, 1949. Believing that McDowell would rule against her, Van Waters, Cross, and other supporters used the proceedings as a platform to present her to the public as an exemplary person and to promote her methods of penal reform. In both goals, they succeeded. The case drew national attention, and an audience of hundreds of people per session attended what some newspaper reports likened to the Scopes Monkey Trial. Freedman writes:

The audience so often took an active role in the hearings that McDowell threatened to clear the auditorium if they did not cease their laughter, applause, or derisive sounds. Housewives, off-duty reformatory staff members, college students, workers on their lunch breaks, and friends filled the auditorium each day; those who could not gain entrance weathered the winter cold as they gathered around the windows and doorways to catch a glimpse of the proceedings.

Eighteen days of examinations, cross-examinations, and speeches produced 2,000 pages of testimony, and on February 11, McDowell confirmed his decision to fire Van Waters on most of the charges he had brought against her, particularly her resistance to his authority as commissioner and to state law. Encouraged by broad public support, Van Waters appealed to Massachusetts Governor Paul Dever for a re-hearing. Dever agreed, appointing a three-member panel to hear the case de novo, beginning March 4. The panel members were Caroline Putnam, a Catholic charities worker; Robert Clark, a county district attorney, and Erwin Griswold, then dean of the Harvard Law School and later a U.S. solicitor general.

During the second hearing, Dwyer presented McDowell's side of the case, questioned Van Waters for four days, including one day devoted to homosexuality, and called many other witnesses to testify, while Cross led the defense, calling on sympathetic witnesses, cross-examining McDowell, and rebutting Dwyer. Henry F. Fielding, a lawyer appointed by the state attorney general to represent the prosecution, gave a weak closing argument. On March 11, the three-member panel unanimously reversed McDowell's decision to fire Van Waters, finding no evidence of irregularities or errors of judgment on her part that were not made in good faith. They praised Van Waters's use of indenture and child-placement, dismissed the charges related to homosexuality, and agreed that Van Waters had operated within her legal authority even though she had not always done what McDowell ordered.

=== Decline (1950–1957) ===
Despite Van Waters' triumph in the hearings, renewed political attacks, changes in prison populations, and changing views about gender, led to new limits on Van Waters' authority. McDowell, until his retirement in 1951, continued to oppose non-domestic indenture and the parole board resisted many of Van Waters' recommendations. One of the board members, Katharine Sullivan, wrote a book, Girls on Parole, in which she claimed that older lesbians in prisons preyed upon younger newcomers and converted them to homosexuality. (Note: Similar claims appear in Caged (1950), a film starring Agnes Moorhead as a prison superintendent who resembles Van Waters, in other films about women's prisons, and in True Confessions magazine stories of the 1950s.) Accusations about drug use and aggressive homosexuality at the reformatory led Van Waters to recruit a student, Katherine Gabel, from Smith College to pose as an inmate. Gabel discovered that an inmate subculture was importing narcotics in the necks of ketchup bottles, and she saw one woman stab another in a fit of jealousy over a third woman. Van Waters subsequently labeled some inmates as "hard core" and asked to have them transferred to other prisons.

During this era, when accusations about homosexuality were often paired with those about communism, Van Waters became close friends with Helen Bryan, who had been the executive secretary of the Joint Anti-Fascist Refugee Committee (JAFRC). Bryan had served time in prison for contempt of Congress after refusing to give the House Un-American Activities Committee a list of JAFRC members and the refugees from Francisco Franco's Spain that they had helped resettle in the United States. After Van Waters found Bryan a temporary job at the reformatory, anti-communist rhetoric aimed at Bryan induced her to resign and led to a hunt for communists at Framingham. An informant for the Federal Bureau of Investigation, after seeing terms of endearment in communications between Van Waters and Bryan, asserted that they were lesbians. The conservative resistance to Van Waters and her methods continued throughout the McCarthy era and culminated shortly after Van Waters' retirement in 1957 with new rules that emphasized discipline, forbade fraternization between staff and inmates, and eliminated the program that allowed mothers and young babies to stay together at the reformatory.

Roughly coinciding with these difficulties at the prison were personal losses for Van Waters', including a decline in health. Her mother had died in 1948, and in 1953 her daughter was killed in an automobile crash. In her diaries from the mid-1950s, Van Waters mentioned bouts of viral pneumonia and pleurisy. In 1956, she fell and bruised her head, and later that year she suffered a brain aneurysm that led to surgery and a long recuperation. About 500 people attended her retirement dinner, held in 1957 at the Harvard Club, after which her successor, Betty Cole Smith, became superintendent at Framingham.

== Retirement, death, and legacy ==
During the early years of her retirement, Van Waters moved into a three-bedroom apartment with two former inmates and staff members, Alice May and Irene Jenner, from the reformatory. Working mostly from home via correspondence and letters to the editor, she supported prison reform, civil rights, and the abolition of the death penalty. She joined the Society of the Companions of the Holy Cross, an organization of Episcopalian women that promoted social justice, and she served as president of the local branch of the Muscular Dystrophy Association.

In 1964, after falling and breaking a hip, Van Waters spent several months in a hospital. Recovered, she made her last journey to New Jersey to visit Thompson, with whom she remained close until Thompson's death, at age 95, in 1967. In 1971, Van Waters donated her books to the University of Oregon Library and her correspondence and professional files to the women's history archive at Radcliffe College. She had a stroke in 1972 and died at home in Framingham in 1974.

Freedman says that Van Waters' legacy survived mainly via the interns and other young women for whom she served as mentor. Many of them continued to work for prison reform and pursued careers at women's prisons and reformatories and in some cases, universities, after Van Waters retired. In 1996 Freedman asserted that "...the reform movement of the late nineteenth and early twentieth centuries seems to have disappeared, and a new vengeance toward prisoners now pervades much of our culture." Chlup in the same year suggested that Van Waters' success with education in prison settings might provide a model for prison reform in the 21st century.

== Bibliography ==
Some of Van Waters' personal papers, titled "Papers of Miriam Van Waters, 1861–1971" (A-71), are housed at the Arthur and Elizabeth Schlesinger Library on the History of Women in America, Radcliffe Institute for Advanced Study, Harvard University. Van Waters, Dorothy Kirchwey Brown, Margaret H. Davis, Ralph Van Waters, and Elizabeth Bode Van Waters donated the correspondence, diaries, case studies, and other materials to the library in 1969–1971, 1974–1975, and 1977. The collection consists of about 22 linear feet (6.7 m) of file boxes, 15 folders of photographs, 14 reels of audiotape, a reel of microfilm, a reel of motion-picture film, and other material.

Others of her personal papers are part of the collection titled "Papers of Anna Spicer Gladding and Miriam Van Waters, 1885–1992" (MC 426) housed at the Schlesinger Library at Harvard. Gladding, hired in 1932 to teach in the nursery at Framingham, served as the organist and choir director for the prison, led study groups, coordinated visitor activities, and became the institution's librarian in 1957. Gladding, Margaret Van Wagenen, Cynthia Thomas, Peter and George Hildebrandt, and Margaret Trapwell donated the correspondence, speeches, diaries, photographs, and other items between 1982 and 1994. The collection consists of 5 feet (1.5 m) of file boxes and folio folders, 57 folders of photographs, an audiotape, and other materials.

Below is a partial list of Van Waters' published work.

=== Books ===
- Parents on Probation. New York: New Republic Company. 1927. OCLC 602538702.
- Youth in Conflict. New York: Republic Publishing Company. 1925. OCLC 255039505.
- Report on the Child Offender in the Federal System of Justice. No. 6 of the Wickersham Commission Reports. United States Government. 1931. OCLC 923706.

=== Articles ===
- "Where Girls Go Right: Some Dynamic Aspects of State Correctional Schools for Girls and Young Women". The Survey. 48 (9). New York: Survey Associates: 361–62. May 27, 1922 – via Google Books.

=== Other ===
- The Adolescent Girl Among Primitive Peoples (Thesis). Clark University. 1913. OCLC 576732296.
- El Retiro: The New School for Girls (Report). Sacramento: California State Board of Health. 1920. OCLC 56813855.

== Notes and references ==
=== Sources ===
- Freedman, Estelle B. (2006a). "Women's Institutions, Social Reform, and the Career of Miriam Van Waters". Feminism, Sexuality and Politics: Essays by Estelle B. Freedman. Chapel Hill: University of North Carolina Press. ISBN 978-0-8078-5694-9.
- Freedman, Estelle B. (2006b). "The Prison Lesbian: Race, Class, and the Construction of the Aggressive Female Homosexual, 1915–1965". Feminism, Sexuality and Politics: Essays by Estelle B. Freedman. Chapel Hill: University of North Carolina Press. ISBN 978-0-8078-5694-9.
- Freedman, Estelle B. (2006c). "The Burning of Letters Continues: Elusive Identities and the Historical Construction of Sexuality". Feminism, Sexuality and Politics: Essays by Estelle B. Freedman. Chapel Hill: University of North Carolina Press. ISBN 978-0-8078-5694-9.
- Freedman, Estelle B. (1996). Maternal Justice: Miriam Van Waters and the Female Reform Tradition. Chicago: The University of Chicago Press. ISBN 978-0-226-26149-2.
- Gardner, Virginia (1982). Friend and Lover: The Life of Louise Bryant. New York: Horizon Press. ISBN 978-0-8180-0233-5.
- Rowles, Burton J. (1962). The Lady at Box 99: The Story of Miriam Van Waters. New York: Seabury Press. OCLC 381901.
- St. Johns, Adela (1974). Some Are Born Great. Garden City, N.Y.: Doubleday. ISBN 978-0-385-08769-8.
