= Mary Sturge Gretton =

British historian and magistrate (1871–1961)

Mary Gertrude Sturge Gretton
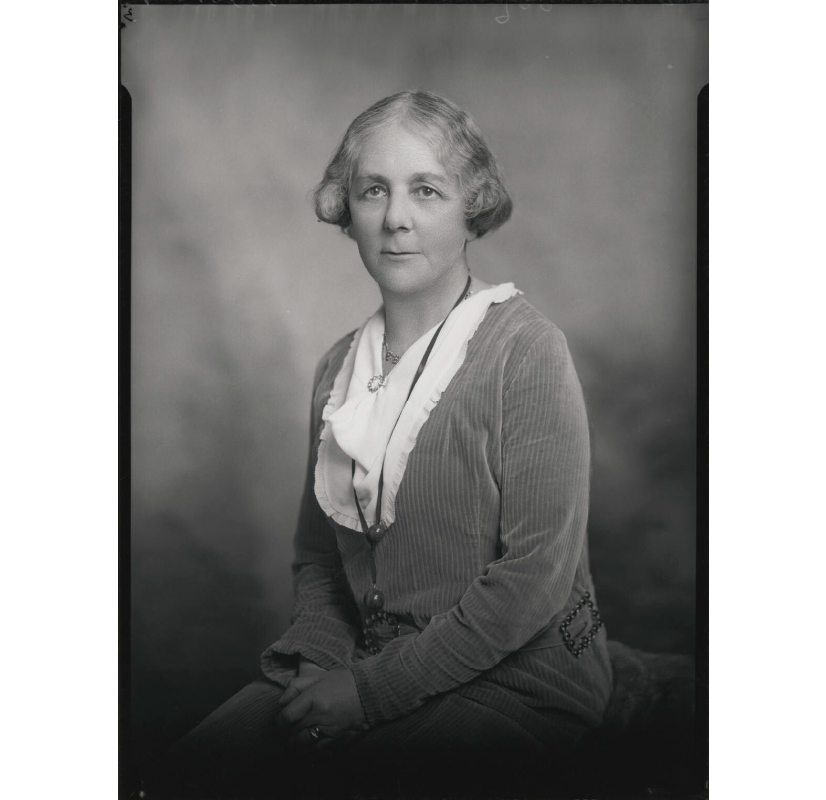
- by "Lafayette"
- Born: May Sturge; 1 May 1871; Gloucester, England
- Died: 15 August 1961 (aged 90); York, England
- Occupations: historian and magistrate

Mary Gertrude Sturge Gretton born May Gertrude Sturge later Mary Gertrude Henderson (1 May 1871 – 15 August 1961) was a British historian and magistrate.

== Life ==
Gretton was born in Gloucester on 1 May 1871 when her first name was May. Her father, Joseph Marshall Sturge JP was a merchant, her mother was Anne (Annie) Burke, was a historian. Her father came from a leading abolitionist family and her mother's family had been slave owners. She and her younger sister Edna Annie Crichton attended Sidcot School. Edna would be Lord mayor of York. Mary went on to another Quaker school The Mount School in York, before going on to study at Mason College in Birmingham.

In 1898 George Cockburn Henderson accepted a position at Sydney University as Acting Professor of History, while the usual professor was on holiday in England. On 5 January 1899, two days before leaving, he and May got married, at the Friends' Meeting Place, Leicester, England. They arrived in Sydney aboard the P & O steamer Oceana in late February.

She returned with her husband in 1900 but when he accepted another job in Australia she refused to go or join him later. In 1902 she published Three Centuries in North Oxfordshire which mixed established history with oral interviews which revealed the opinions of interviewees and their parents about past time. In 1907 Charles Scribner's Sons published her George Meredith: Novelist, Poet, Reformer.

In 1910 she was living with Richard Henry Gretton when was the London editor of the Manchester Guardian and her estranged husband started divorce proceedings. The divorce was final in 1911 and in 1912 she married Gretton. In 1912 she abandoned the name of May and adopted the name of Mary. In 1914 she published A Corner of the Cotswolds: through the Nineteenth Century.

In 1921 she was an early woman Justice of the Peace. She took a strong interest in the probation service and in the Prisoners Aid Society. The Society of Oxford Home Students was allowed to give women degrees and Gretton joined in 1924. She spent some time studying further Oxfordshire history but then undertook a study of George Meredith. Her The Writings and Life of George Meredith was not too academic, but she gained a degree in 1926.

Gretton died in at The Retreat in York in 1961.
