= Hoder =

Hoder may refer to:

- Hoder (Marvel Comics), fictional character
- Hossein Derakhshan (born 1975), Iranian-born Canadian journalist nicknamed "Hoder"
- 4669 Høder, main belt asteroid

== See also ==
- Höðr, Norse mythological figure
- Hodder (disambiguation)
- Hodor (disambiguation)
