= Carl Bridenbaugh =

American historian (1903–1992)

- Born: August 10, 1903; Philadelphia, Pennsylvania, U.S.
- Died: January 6, 1992 (aged 88); Providence, Rhode Island, U.S.
- Education: Dartmouth College; University of Pennsylvania; Harvard University
- Occupation: Historian
- Spouse(s): Jessica Hill (m. 1931; died 1943) Roberta Haines Herriott

Carl Bridenbaugh (August 10, 1903 – January 6, 1992) was an American historian of Colonial America. He wrote fourteen books and edited or co-edited five more, becoming acclaimed as a historian and teacher.

== Career ==
Born in Philadelphia and raised in its rural suburbs, he received his bachelor's degree from Dartmouth College in 1925, studied at the University of Pennsylvania for two years, and completed his master's and doctoral degrees at Harvard University in 1930 and 1936, respectively. At Harvard he worked closely with urban historian Arthur M. Schlesinger, Sr. He taught at MIT from 1927 to 1938, Harvard in 1929–1930, and Brown University from 1938 to 1942 before leaving for wartime service in the Navy.

In 1938, the American Historical Association awarded Bridenbaugh's Cities in the Wilderness the Justin Winsor Prize for the best book by a young scholar on the history of the Americas, and the book quickly became a classic among historians. He was an organizer and the first director (1945–1950) of the Institute of Early American History and Culture, which he moved to Williamsburg, Virginia for five years to oversee. He was a fellow of the Center for Advanced Study in the Behavioral Sciences (1956–1958) and a Guggenheim fellow (1958–1962). He was elected to the American Philosophical Society in 1958. He later taught at the University of California, Berkeley 1950–1962 and again at Brown from 1962 until his retirement in 1969. He was elected to the American Academy of Arts and Sciences in 1963. He was also president of the American Historical Association in 1962.

== Scholarship ==
Bridenbaugh is best known for his two major books on colonial cities: Cities in the Wilderness-The First Century of Urban Life in America 1625–1742 (1938) and Cities in Revolt: Urban Life in America, 1743–1776 (1955). In them he examined in depth five key cities: Boston (population 16,000 in 1760), Newport Rhode Island (population 7500), New York City (population 18,000), Philadelphia (population 23,000), and Charles Town (Charlestown, South Carolina), (population 8000). He argues they grew from small villages to take major leadership roles in promoting trade, land speculation, immigration, and prosperity, and in disseminating the ideas of the Enlightenment, and new methods in medicine and technology. Furthermore, they sponsored a consumer taste for English amenities, developed a distinctly American educational system, and began systems for care of people meeting welfare. The cities were not remarkable by European standards, but they did display certain distinctly American characteristics, according to Bridenbaugh. There was no aristocracy or established church, there was no long tradition of powerful guilds. The colonial governments were much less powerful and intrusive and corresponding national governments in Europe. They experimented with new methods to raise revenue, build infrastructure and to solve urban problems. They were more democratic than European cities, in that a large fraction of the men could vote, and class lines were more fluid. Contrasted to Europe, printers (especially as newspaper editors) had a much larger role in shaping public opinion, and lawyers moved easily back and forth between politics and their profession. Bridenbaugh argues that by the mid-18th century, the middle-class businessmen, professionals, and skilled artisans dominated the cities. He characterizes them as "sensible, shrewd, frugal, ostentatiously moral, generally honest," public spirited, and upwardly mobile, and argues their economic strivings led to "democratic yearnings" for political power.

== Personal life ==
Bridenbaugh married twice, first in 1931 to Jessica Hill, who died in 1943, and then a short time later to Roberta Haines Herriott (1902–1996). He died of cancer in Rhode Island Hospital, Providence.

He was a member of the Massachusetts Historical Society.

== Works ==
- Cities in the Wilderness: The First Century of Urban Life in America, 1625–1742. New York: Alfred A. Knopf. 1938. Archived from the original on 2013-08-01 – via Questia.
- Rebels and Gentlemen: Philadelphia in the Age of Franklin (1942)
- Peter Harrison: First American Architect (1949)
- Seat of Empire (1950)
- Myths and Realities: Societies of the Colonial South (1952)
- Cities in Revolt: Urban Life in America, 1743–1776 (1955)
- Mitre and Sceptre: Transatlantic Faith, Ideas, Personalities, and Politics (1962) [ online] edition free
- Vexed and Troubled Englishmen, 1590–1642: The Beginnings of the American People (1968)
- No Peace Beyond the Line (1971)
- Fat Mutton and Liberty of Conscience: Society in Rhode Island, 1636–1690 (1974)
- The Spirit of '76': The Growth of American Patriotism Before Independence (1975)
- Jamestown 1544–1699 (1980)
- Early Americans (1981)
- The Colonial Craftsman (1990)
