= R. H. Gretton =

British novelist and historian

Richard Henry Gretton (1874 – 24 February 1936) was a British novelist and historian.

== Early life and career ==
He was educated at Magdalen College, Oxford and afterwards worked as London editor of The Manchester Guardian.

Gretton's 1913 popular history of Britain, A Modern History of the English People, was originally published in 1913 and updated in 1930 to bring the history down to the fall of the Lloyd George coalition government in 1922. Virginia Woolf made twenty-three pages of notes on Gretton's book as part of her background reading for her 1937 novel The Years.

During the First World War he was a private in the Royal Garrison Artillery and he also served in the Labour Corps in France. In 1918 he was appointed to the Army Education Department at the War Office. In 1920 he was made vice-principal of Ruskin College.

From 14 June to 19 July 1929, Gretton delivered a series of broadcasts for BBC radio on the subject of "Some Makers of Modern Politics", in which he explored various Victorian statesmen and their influence.

== Personal life ==
Gretton married Mary Sturge, who died in York on 15 August 1961, aged 90.

== Works ==
- Ingram (London: Grant Richards, 1911).
- Almayne of Mainfort (London: Grant Richards, 1912).
- Imperialism and Mr. Gladstone, 1876–1887 (London: G. Bell & Sons, 1913).
- The King's Majesty: A Study of the Growth of the Central Administration (London: G. Bell & Sons, 1913; second edition, 1930).
- A Modern History of the English People (London: Grant Richards, 1913; second edition, 1930).
- History (London: Secker, 1914).
- The English Middle Class (London: Bell, 1919).
- The Burford Records: A Study in Minor Town Government (Oxford: Clarendon Press, 1920).
- The Ancient Remains of Oxford Castle (Oxford: Phipps & Co., 1925; second edition, 1935).
- 'England in 1910', The Spectator (10 May 1935).
