= Hodor (disambiguation) =

Hodor is a fictional character from the epic fantasy novel series A Song of Ice and Fire and its TV adaptation, Game of Thrones.

Hodor may also refer to:

- An alternative spelling of al-Hudfir, Oman

== See also ==
- Höðr, a Norse god
- Hoder (disambiguation)
- Hodder (disambiguation)
