= Edna Annie Crichton =

Lord Mayor of York (1941–42)

Edna Annie Crichton Cllr. Ald.
- York's first woman Lord Mayor, Edna Annie Crichton, pictured in November 1941.

Lord Mayor of York
- In office 1941–1942
- Monarch: George VI
- Preceded by: William Horsman
- Succeeded by: Edward Lacy

City of York councillor
- In office 1919–1955

Personal details
- Born: Edna Annie Crichton; 1876
- Died: 1970 (aged 93–94)
- Party: None (independent)
- Occupation: Politician

Edna Annie Crichton (1 May 1876 – 5 March 1970) was lord mayor of York from 1941 to 1942, the first woman to hold that position.

== Biography ==
Crichton was born in Gloucester on 1 May 1876. Her father, Joseph Marshall Sturge JP was a merchant, her mother was Anne (Annie) Burke, and her sister was Mary Sturge Gretton, historian. Crichton attended Sidcot School and worked on the Passmore Edwards settlement in Bloomsbury, London. In the early 1910s, she took on a role in York, serving on the national health insurance committee and on the board of guardians for the city.

In 1919, Crichton was elected to City of York Council, a position she would go on to hold for 23 years. Crichton was Lord Mayor of York from 1941 to 1942, the first woman to hold that position. As lord mayor, she led the city through the Baedeker raids. She spent her time visiting hospitals and many of the bombed houses.

Crichton was also the first female Alderman in York, a position she took on in 1942 and she held for 13 years, concerning herself with social interests such as health, housing and education, sitting on committees for each. She led initiatives on the housing front, establishing a committee on housing and ensured construction of new houses and removal of dilapidated ones. In 1955, on her retirement, she became the second woman to receive the Freedom of the City of York.

She married David Sprunt Crichton on 22 August 1901 and they had two children, Vida and David. After retirement in 1955, she continued to live in York until her death at Clifton on 5 March 1970.

In 2017 a blue plaque was unveiled at her house at 30 Clifton in York celebrating her achievements. The plaque was unveiled by Rt Hon Lord Mayor of York, Councillor Barbara Boyce. Three other women ex-Lord Mayors witnessed the unveiling.

Civic offices
| Preceded by William Horsman | Lord Mayor of York; 1941–1942 | Succeeded by Edward Lacy |
