= Annie Heloise Abel =

American historian (1873-1947)

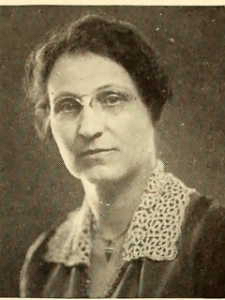
- Abel in 1922
- Born: February 18, 1873
- Died: March 14, 1947 (aged 74)
- Other name: Annie Heloise Abel-Henderson
- Awards: Justin Winsor Prize in 1903
- Scientific career
- Fields: History

Annie Heloise Abel (February 18, 1873 – March 14, 1947) was an American historian who was among the earliest professional historians to study Native Americans. She was one of the first thirty women in the United States to earn a PhD in history. Abel was an expert on the history of British and American Indian policies. According to historian James Anderson, she was "the first academically trained historian in the United States to consider the development of Indian-white relations."

== Early life and education ==
Abel was born at Fernhurst, Sussex, England to George Abel and Amelia Anne Hogben. She emigrated to the U.S. in 1885, following her parents who were settling in Salina, Kansas, for the second time. Her father worked as a gardener and her mother ran a small family farm. Abel attended Salina High School, graduating in 1893. She immediately began teaching in the Kansas public schools. In 1895, Abel began studies at the University of Kansas, where her undergraduate studies were free. After two years of high school teaching, she attended the University of Kansas for her M.A. in History. Under the direction of Kansas historian Frank Haywood Hodder, Abel wrote an M.A. thesis entitled: "Indian Reservations in Kansas and the Extinguishment of Their Title." Based on that work, her Kansas advisor there recommended her for PhD coursework at Cornell University in Ithaca, New York and Abel began her studies there in 1900. After her potential advisor, Moses Coit Tyler, died, she decided to leave Cornell, and return to Kansas. To pay for graduate tuition, she returned to teaching high school from 1901 to 1903.

In 1903, with the encouragement of Kansas faculty, Abel applied for a Bulkley Scholarship in American History to fund her PhD degree at Yale University. When her sister, Rosa Abel, begin PhD work in English Literature at Yale, Abel moved to New Haven to take up her studies at Yale University. She intended to focus on Native Americans and U.S. Indian policy, a topic no professional historians had researched in detail.

At Yale, Abel studied with Edward Gaylord Bourne. She was the first person to use and analyze Indian Office records to understand federal policy and the idea of Indian Removal. Her dissertation, entitled “The History of Events Resulting in Indian Consolidation West of the Mississippi,” was published in the Annual Report (1907) of the American Historical Association. It became the standard work on federal policies resulting in Indian Removal. Her thorough research of Indian Office and congressional records became a model for the first generation of scholars and Native activists to criticize those policies.

== Early career: research and academic achievements ==
The American Historical Association awarded her the Justin Winsor Prize in 1906 for her early work. That prize, created by the American Historical Association to recognize the best manuscript in the history of the Western Hemisphere, made Annie Abel an authority on national Indian policy. Because only teaching colleges or women's colleges would hire women, it took her some years to find full-time academic work. Abel served briefly as the Historian for the U.S. Indian office and taught part-time at Goucher College, a women's college outside of Washington, D.C. She became active in local suffrage politics after she became a citizen in 1910. She was hired as a faculty member at Smith College in Northampton Massachusetts in 1908 and spent 12 years teaching there, moving up the academic ladder.

While conducting research in Australia, she met and married George Cockburn Henderson, an Australian historian, in October 1922, in Adelaide, Australia. The following year he had a mental breakdown and was hospitalized in June 1923. Abel then returned to the United States.^{[8]} The marriage was later dissolved.^{[9]} During the 1924–1925 school year Abel taught history at Sweet Briar College in Aberdeen, Washington. Her parents and several siblings had settled in southwest Washington state in the 1910s where logging and fishing had brought a booming population. After she received the Alice Freeman Palmer Traveling Fellowship awarded by the American Association of University Women in 1925, she resumed her intensive research in England and Australia.

== Later career and publication record ==
In 1928 Abel-Henderson was appointed professor of history at the University of Kansas. She left after only one semester when she received a two-year research grant from the Social Science Research Council. Those funds enabled her to travel to Canada, Washington, D.C., and St. Louis, Missouri, and to continue her studies on British policies toward Australian aborigines. In the 1930s, she retired to Aberdeen, Washington, but continued her scholarship by receiving foundation and library study awards. She wrote four books in the 1930s, but turned her attention to publishing valuable accounts of western travel, the fur trade, and Indian policy that she had unearthed in her research.

She edited the letters, diaries, and account books of Francis A. Chardon, a fur trader who had traveled and lived among American Indians on the Upper Missouri from 1834 to 1839. Abel published that rare account of life in the Upper Missouri River in 1932. She and her sister, Rose Abel Wright, also with a Yale PhD, collaborated on translating and editing another trader's account that Abel found among French geographer Joseph Nicollet's papers that ended up in the U.S. War Department Library. This account of a French expedition along the Missouri and Mississippi Rivers in 1803–1805 overlapped with the U.S. Lewis and Clark expedition and left a vital map that remained unknown until Abel and her sister brought it to life. That edition of the Loisel expedition, was titled Tabeau’s Narrative of Loisel’s Expedition to the Upper Missouri, and published in 1939.

After World War Two ended, Abel-Henderson and her sisters worked with the British-American War Relief Association in Seattle, helping to resettle British families in the Pacific North West. Abel-Henderson also founded a chapter of the Daughters of the British Empire, an organization that supported retirement homes from British emigres. In 1946 the British government decorated her for her work.^{[3]} Annie Abel died of cancer in 1947 and was buried with her parents and sisters in Montesano Washington. When Abel died, she had two books in progress, one a comparative history of British, U.S. and Australian Native policies and the other a comparative history of suffrage.

== Works ==
Her works include:

- Her master's thesis: Abel, Annie Heloise (1903). Indian Reservations in Kansas and the Extinguishment of their Title. Library Reprints, Incorporated. ISBN 9780722248959.
- Her doctoral dissertation: Abel, Annie Heloise (1908). The History of Events Resulting in Indian Consolidation West of the Mississippi River.
- Abel, Annie Heloise (1992). The American Indian as Slaveholder and Secessionist. U of Nebraska Press. ISBN 0803259204.
- Abel, Annie Heloise (1992). The American Indian in the Civil War, 1862-1865. U of Nebraska Press. ISBN 0803259190.
- Abel, Annie Heloise (1993). The American Indian and the End of the Confederacy, 1863-1866. U of Nebraska Press. ISBN 0803259212.
- Chardon's journal at Fort Clark, 1834-1839;

Abel's papers may be found in the repository of Washington State University Libraries, in Pullman, WA. The collection includes notes, correspondence, newspaper clippings, manuscripts and other printed materials related to native policies of several English-speaking countries, as well as other historical subjects such as Russian history and women's suffrage.
