= Anson D. Morse =

American educator and historian (1846–1916)

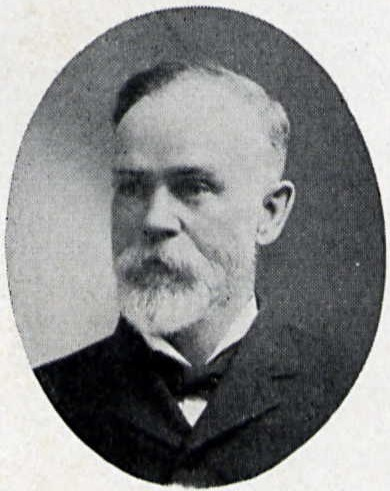
- Born: August 13, 1846; Cambridge, Vermont, U.S.
- Died: March 13, 1916 (aged 69); Amherst, Massachusetts, U.S.
- Education: Amherst College
- Occupation: Historian
- Writing career
- Period: 1871 - 1907

Anson Daniel Morse (August 13, 1846 – March 13, 1916) was an educator, historian, and professor at Amherst College.

Morse was born in Cambridge, Vermont. He received his bachelor's degree from Amherst College in 1871. He joined the faculty of Amherst College in 1876, and held positions as lecturer in political economics and professor of history. He retired in 1907.

Morse emphasized in his studies that political parties expressed the popular will.

His most famous undergraduate was perhaps Calvin Coolidge. From Coolidge's college years at Amherst, the two professors who influenced him the most were Morse in history and Charles Edward Garman in philosophy and ethics. Herman Vandenburg Ames was also a student of Morse.

Morse was elected a member of the American Antiquarian Society in 1903.

== Sources ==
- bio connected with the collection of Morse's papers
