= Mary Wilhelmine Williams =

Teacher, historian, pacifist, feminist (1878–1944)

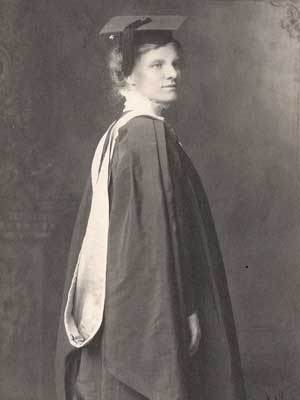
Williams c. 1907.

Mary Wilhelmine Williams (May 14, 1878 – March 10, 1944) specialized in Latin American history. She was on the board of editors of the Hispanic American Historical Review from 1927 to 1933 and was secretary of the Conference on Latin American History in 1928 and 1934.

Williams is credited for starting the first collegiate course in Canadian history in the United States in 1916. She contributed to the Dictionary of American Biography and wrote two books on Scandinavia.

Williams was an active feminist and pacifist. She was a member of the Women's International League for Peace and Freedom and was founder of the California chapter of the National Woman's Party in California. Also, she was the editor of Equal Rights, an independent feminist weekly from 1935 to 1936.

== Biography ==
Williams was born on May 14, 1878, on a remote farm in Stanislaus County, California. Her mother, Caroline Madsen, was from Denmark and her father, Charles Williams, was born in Sweden. Williams came from a large and impoverished family of four sisters and two brothers.

At the age of eighteen Williams attended San Jose State Normal School in California and graduated in 1901. She was a teacher for three years before attending Stanford University, where she received her M.A. in 1908. Williams went back to teaching from 1908 to 1911 while studying at the University of Chicago during the summers. She took a trip to London, England, in 1911 to research her doctoral dissertation at the Public Record Office. Williams received her Ph.D. in 1914 and became an instructor in history at Stanford University. Her dissertation, Anglo-American Isthmian Diplomacy, 1815–1915, won the Justin Winsor Prize of the American Historical Association. From 1914 to 1915 Williams was an instructor in history at Wellesley College. Williams taught at Goucher College in Baltimore as a professor from 1921 to 1940. There she taught one of the first college courses offered in the United States on women's history.

From 1918 to 1919 Williams served the government of Honduras as a cartographic, geographic, and historical specialist in relation with its border disagreements with Guatemala and Nicaragua. On behalf of the American Association of University Women, Williams traveled to fifteen Latin American countries to survey their higher education facilities for women in 1926. The US State Department appointed Williams to serve on a variety of committees dealing with Latin American problems. In 1940 she was presented with a decoration from the Dominican government in recognition of her work in promoting understanding between the two countries.

Williams was an ardent pacifist and feminist, joining the Women's International League for Peace and Freedom in 1919 and serving as the president of its Baltimore branch from 1933 to 1939. In 1925, she joined the National Woman's Party after being convinced by an article she read by M. Carey Thomas that endorsed its proposed Equal Rights Amendment. During her 1926 AAUW study of women's education in Latin America, she met numerous feminist and pacifist activists there. She became close friends with the Brazilian feminist Bertha Lutz, and the two influenced each other's thought and activism.

She remained a professor at Goucher College until 1940 when she retired to Palo Alto, California. Williams died from a stroke in her Palo Alto home on March 10, 1944. Her grave is marked "Teacher, Historian, Pacifist, Feminist."

== Legacy ==
Williams challenged the then popular North American view that the cultural or 'racial' traits of Latin Americans resulted in their underdevelopment, which she attributed instead to economic and historic circumstance. Through her work, she advocated for the respect and recognition of the historical struggle of Latin American peoples, as well as women in general, decades before the U.S. academic mainstream had begun to do so.

Her 1930 book, The People and Politics of Latin America, was an important foundation for teachers and students in the field of Latin-American history being one of the first college textbooks on Latin American history in the U.S.

== Works ==
- 1916: Cousin-hunting in Scandinavia
- 1916: Anglo-American Isthmian Diplomacy, 1815–1915
- 1920: Social Scandinavia in the Viking Age
- 1930: The People and Politics of Latin America
- 1937: Dom Pedro the Magnanimous, Second Emperor of Brazil

== See also ==
- List of peace activists
