= John V. Richardson Jr. =

American professor of information studies

John Vinson Richardson Jr. is an American professor of information studies at University of California, Los Angeles, with a significant record of research and publications on intelligent question answering systems, reference service, and history of librarianship. His current research focuses on assessment and evaluation issues related to virtual reference (i.e., chat) such as time in queue, service duration, content analysis or microanalysis of questions, as well as user satisfaction. Currently, Richardson also serves as an adjunct professor in the School of Information Studies at Charles Sturt University in NSW, Australia.

== Education ==
Richardson attended Whetstone High School (Columbus, Ohio), received a B.A. in sociology from Ohio State University (1971), an MLS from Peabody College, Vanderbilt University (1972, Beta Phi Mu), and a doctorate from Indiana University (1978). He has said of his educational preparation, "I wanted to do something relevant, then useful, and finally something interesting."

== Career ==
Before Richardson joined the faculty of the University of California, Los Angeles in 1978 as an assistant professor in the Graduate School of Library and Information Science, he had interned with Carolyn Hammer of the King Library Press and apprenticed briefly with Richard-Gabriel Rummonds of the Plain Wrapper Press in Vernona, Italy. He was promoted to associate professor with tenure in 1983 and to full professor in 1998. In the spring of 1986, he was a consultant on rare books and government documents at the Los Angeles Public Library after their disastrous fire. He offered one of the first for-credit classes on Google in the spring term of 2007. He also has served as associate dean of UCLA's Graduate Division for five years. Richardson was promoted to professor emeritus in February 2013 and served as an adjunct professor at Charles Sturt University in New South Wales, Australia through the 2018 academic year. Richardson's research interests have focused on the development of intelligent question answering systems, the evaluation of reference services, and the history of librarianship. He has published over 100 articles in academic journals and books, and he is the author or co-author of fifteen books before retirement. More recently, Richardson is a specialist in family history and genealogical research.

== Awards ==
Richardson has gained international recognition and garnered multiple awards. In recognition of his significant research contributions in the field of Library and Information Science, Richardson was appointed as the Visiting Distinguished Scholar to the prestigious Office of Research at OCLC, Inc., for the academic year 1996-1997. Richardson is the author of more than a dozen scholarly books and dozens of articles, and for eight years from 1995 to 2003, he served as the editor in chief of the premier journal in librarianship, the Library Quarterly, published by the University of Chicago Press. He has been awarded numerous prizes including the Justin Winsor Prize from the American Library Association Library History Round Table and the Best Information Science Book award from the American Society for Information Science and Technology. In 2020, the Ohio Genealogical Society recognized his Die Weber Familie (ITA Press) with their William J. and Benjamin S. Harrison Prize for the Best Family History.

Richardson's work has worldwide recognition, and he has studied and lectured in Aberystwyth University, Wales (Beta Phi Mu Scholar); Australia; Eritrea; in the Russian Federation (ALISE Teaching Fellow in Moscow and St. Petersburg) including the Russian Far East (Vladivostok, Khabarovsk, and Sakhalin Island), Tanzania; Turkmenistan; Uganda; and Zambia. He is the recipient of two Fulbright scholarships in 2005 and 2012 from the Fulbright Program, and has lectured internationally as a guest of the United States Department of State.

== Published works ==
Richardson's published books include:

- Richardson on Reference (forthcoming).
- Understanding Reference Transactions: Transforming an Art into Science (San Diego, CA: Academic Press, 2002) (Matthew L. Saxton, co-author).
- Knowledge-Based Systems in General Reference Work: Applications, Problems, and Progress (New York: Academic Press, 1995).
- The Gospel of Scholarship: Pierce Butler and A Critique of American Librarianship (Metuchen, NJ: Scarecrow Press, 1992).
- The Spirit of Inquiry: The Graduate Library School at Chicago, 1921-1951 (Chicago: American Library Association, 1982).
