= Ethel Sturges Dummer =

American progressive activist and writer

- Born: October 23, 1866; Chicago, Illinois, U.S.
- Died: February 25, 1954 (aged 87); Winnetka, Illinois
- Education: Kirkland School, Chicago
- Known for: Philanthropy, social reform, writing
- Spouse: William Francis Dummer (m. 1888)
- Children: Marion, Ethel, Katharine, Frances, William
- Parent(s): Mary Delafield Sturges and George Sturges

Ethel Sturges Dummer (1866–1954) was a Chicago-based progressive activist, writer, and philanthropist whose interests encompassed child labor laws, prison reform, education, psychology, and conservation.

== Family life ==
Born in Chicago in 1866 to Mary (Delafield) Sturges and George Sturges, one of the city's wealthiest families. When she was a young girl, her father described her "as homely as a hedge fence" and chastised for being like the boys and climbing trees. She graduated in 1885 from the Kirkland School, a high school, in Chicago. Dummer's wide-ranging interests included biology, psychiatry, anthropology, and economics. She married William Francis Dummer (1851–1928), a prominent Chicago banker, in 1888. The couple had four daughters—Marion, Ethel, Katharine, and Frances—and a son who died in infancy.

After 1947, Dummer lived with her daughter Katharine Dummer Fisher in Winnetka, Illinois. She died in Winnetka in 1954; memorial services were held at the Institute for Juvenile Research in Chicago.

== Social activism ==
Although she had no formal education beyond secondary school and never held a paid job, Ethel Sturges Dummer played a significant role in the Chicago school of sociology and in professional sociology in general, according to sociologist Jennifer Platt. Dummer funded projects she considered important and encouraged professionals to work on them. She often provided to these professionals relevant data gathered by networks of social reformers, many of them women.

In 1905, she joined the National Child Labor Committee and the Chicago Juvenile Protective Association, and in 1908, she became a founder and trustee of the Chicago School of Civics and Philanthropy, later the University of Chicago School of Social Service Administration. She extended financial support to entities such as the Juvenile Psychopathic Institute and to prominent psychologists, psychiatrists, and sociologists including Adolf Meyer, Thomas Eliot, William Alanson White, Trigant Burrow, Katharine Anthony, Jessie Taft, and others. She funded research, writing, and administrative projects undertaken by Miriam Van Waters, a well-known prison reformer. She helped found the Illinois Society for Mental Hygiene and served on the boards of the City Club of Chicago, and the National Probation Association.

In September 1917, Dummer was invited by Raymond Fosdick to join the Committee on Protective Work for Girls (CPWG), along with Maude Miner, Abby Rockefeller, Vera Cushmann and Martha Falconer. The CPWG became the enforcement arm of The American Plan. Despite early reservations that the committee could be used to repress young women rather than protect them, Dummer accepted Fosdick's invitation stating "the work is somewhat appalling [but] is of great importance, and feeling sure that under Maude Miner it will be not merely repressive, but constructive in a large way, I will serve on the committee on Protective Work for Girls."

The committee started recruiting women to serve as protective officers—to hit the streets and look for women in need of protection. Dummer herself traveled to Camp Devens, in Massachusetts, to inspect conditions for women, while Miner journeyed to the Midwest. Foslick didn't provide the committee with enough money to implement an individual casework model and so Dummer funded the CPWG herself within a few months of joining.

== Published works ==
In a review of Dummer's autobiography, Why I Think So – The Autobiography of an Hypothesis (1937), Thomas Eliot of Northwestern University, said, "Mrs. Dummer is best recognized in her intellectual enthusiasms, and in her generous tributes and contributions (spiritual and material) to the work of others." She also published The Unconscious: A Symposium (1928); The Evolution of a Biological Faith (1943), and What is Thought? (1945).

Dummer's published work includes prefaces to The Unadjusted Girl by William I. Thomas (1923), a prominent sociologist and author. Concerned about the unequal treatment of women and men involved in what were known as sexual vice crimes, Dummer paid Thomas $5,000 a year for two years to research and analyze cases involving female prostitutes and unmarried mothers. Drawn to the work of Mary Boole and her husband, mathematician George Boole, Dummer supported publication of Mary Boole's collected works in 1931 and wrote a pamphlet, Mary E. Boole: A Pioneer Student of the Unconscious in 1945.
