= Jessie Donaldson Hodder =

American pianist and social reformer (1867–1931)

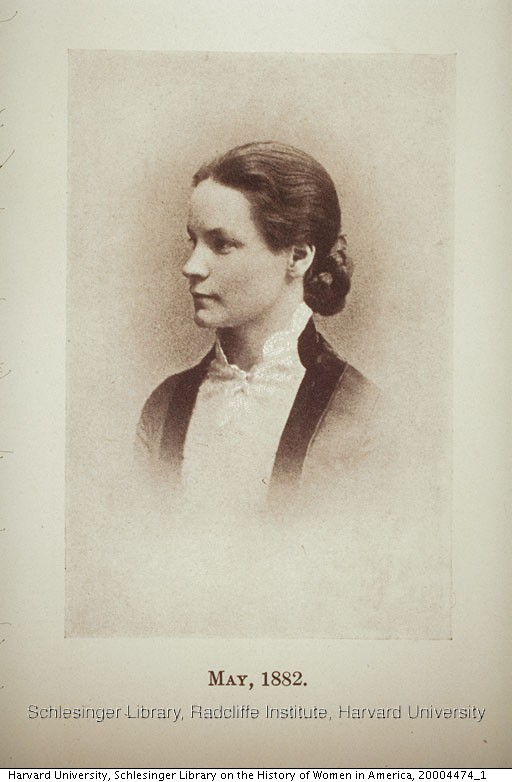
Jessie Donaldson Hodder in 1882

Jessie Donaldson Hodder (March 30, 1867 – November 19, 1931) was a women's prison reformer.

== Early life ==
Jessie Donaldson was born in Cincinnati, Ohio. Her mother died when she was a toddler and her father, upon remarrying, gave her to his Scottish-born mother to raise along with four other sons still at home. Her grandmother taught Jessie to be a housekeeper and seamstress; while the grandmother did not encourage her to go to school, she did allow her to have piano lessons. In 1885, Jessie moved with her grandmother and an uncle, an executive for a railroad, to New York City, where she continued her piano studies.

== Personal life ==
In 1889 she met Alfred LeRoy Hodder (1866-1907), a lawyer from Colorado who was visiting his parents with his dying wife, Olive Dickinson Hodder. Soon after Olive died, Jessie and Alfred began a love affair. Two years later, Alfred gave up a philosophy fellowship he had won at Harvard to follow her to Europe, where she had moved to continue her piano study. Without any marriage ceremony, Jessie assumed his last name. They traveled throughout Europe and lived as husband and wife in Freiburg and Leipzig, Germany. Their daughter, Olive, was born in Florence, Italy, on April 14, 1893, in the flat of Professor William James and his wife, Alice Gibben James.

The following year, the family returned to the United States and moved to Rosemont, Pennsylvania, where Alfred taught English literature at Bryn Mawr College until 1898. A second child, James Alan Hodder, was born in 1897. Meanwhile, Alfred, known as the "Byron of Bryn Mawr," was engaged in an affair with Miss Mary Mackall Gwinn, another English professor, who was the live-in companion and lover of the Dean and President of the College, Martha Carey Thomas. This love quadrangle was later fictionalized by Gertrude Stein in her first novel, Fernhurst: The History of Phillip Redfern, A Student of the Nature of Women.

In 1898, insisting that the affair was over, Alfred Hodder put his common-law wife, Jessie, and their two children on a ship from New York back to Germany, promising to join them. Instead, he settled in Manhattan, became a bestselling novelist and muckraking journalist determined to take on the corruption of Tammany Hall, and worked as the private secretary for illustrious Manhattan District Attorney William Travers Jerome. In June 1904, denying any marriage tie to Jessie as well as paternity of his son, James Alan, Alfred married Mary Gwinn.

Jessie remained abroad for eight years, supporting herself and the children as a pianist, English translator, and teacher, living first in Leipzig and then in the village of Cormondrèche, Neuchâtel, Switzerland. She became fluent in French and German. Soon after Alfred's wedding to Miss Gwinn, 11-year-old Olive died from with scarlet fever. Depressed and destitute, Jessie considered suicide, but eventually she and her son returned to the United States thanks to the generosity of a friend of Alice James, philanthropist and social reformer Elizabeth Glendower Evans. Jessie arrived in Boston in 1906 without a profession or any means of support, but Mrs. Evans secured her a job at the Lancaster Industrial School for Girls, and hired two lawyers to sue Alfred for bigamy and child support. Alfred was at this point a well-known writer who also still worked for the New York District Attorney William Jerome. Shortly before what would have been a high-profile trial, in March 1907, Alfred Hodder died mysteriously in a New York City jail.

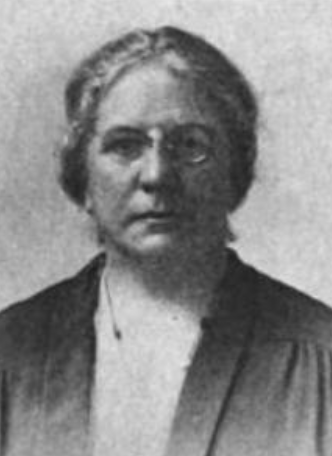
Jessie Donaldson Hodder, from a 1926 publication

== Prison reform ==
In 1907, a friend of Mrs. Evans', Richard Clarke Cabot, a pioneer in medical social work and founder of the social services department at Massachusetts General Hospital, hired Jessie as a counselor of expectant unwed mothers, syphilitics, and alcoholics. Jessie became known as a dedicated and compassionate worker who held the confidence of her charges and their families. At Mass. General, she developed guidelines for the treatment of unwed mothers, to which she adhered throughout her ensuing career: that the father should be sued for support but should not be forced into marriage, and that the mother should be helped to keep her child.

In 1911, Jessie was appointed superintendent of the Massachusetts Prison and Reformatory for Women in Sherborn. As a rare "working single mother," she unblocked the prison cell windows to views of the meadows, persuaded the Massachusetts legislature to delete the word "Prison" from the institution’s name, built a gymnasium, planted the fields, and developed the institution’s labor and education programs so that inmates could be taught skills appropriate for the particular industry that best matched their aptitude. She reduced the inmates' former full workday to an intensive half-day, using the remaining hours for recreation and education. She established a regular school staffed with trained teachers who taught at all levels. More gifted inmates were encouraged to take university extension courses in languages, business subjects, and domestic science. Jessie maintained that recreation was a form of therapy, and developed outdoor sports in the summer and drama and music in the winter, staging and playing piano for several Gilbert and Sullivan musicals. She did all this while demonstrating to the state legislature that her new program actually increased productivity. For example, output in the "shirt room" increased 40 percent, and the institution's cattle and poultry industries were further developed, with products being sold to other institutions as well as on the open market.

Under her regime, the Massachusetts Reformatory took the lead in the United States in the study of the individual prisoner and importance of detailed case records. Aware of rapidly unfolding developments in psychology and the social sciences and of Katharine Bement Davis' experiments at the New York Reformatory for Women, Jessie Hodder insisted on medical and psychiatric examinations and repeatedly requested funds for a resident psychiatrist. She ensured that psychiatric care, classes, and work programs were specifically tailored and geared to the needs of the individual inmate. In 1912, she appointed a resident social worker and established a research department. She stressed the importance of case records not only for considering parole, but for understanding the social causes of delinquency.

While Jessie oversaw remodeling and modernization of the Framingham facility, she wanted to construct a separate building for the youngest inmates and also build a colony of separate, self-contained cottages for the more independent inmates, similar to the ones she’d managed in her first position at Lancaster. After her death, her successor, Miriam Van Waters, built two stand-alone houses separate from the Reformatory and a third new, large building exclusively for inmates between the ages of 17 and 21. Van Waters dedicated the large building "Hodder Hall."

== Legacy ==
Jessie Hodder died of chronic myocarditis at her home in the Framingham Reformatory in 1931, at the age of sixty-four, surrounded by her son, his wife, and her three grandchildren.
