= John Musser =

American historian (1889–1949)

John Musser (November 14, 1889 – March 21, 1949) was an American historian and educator who was dean of the graduate school at New York University and an instructor of American History.

Musser attended Franklin and Marshall College before transferring to the University of Pennsylvania, from which he received his bachelor's degree. He went on to also earn his Ph.D. from Pennsylvania under the direction of Herman Vandenburg Ames. An authority on Benjamin Franklin, in 1937 Musser debunked a claim made by the Nazi Party that Charles Pinkney had once recorded in his diary that Franklin had made an antisemitic prophecy about a future threat of Jews in the United States by noting that Pinckney had never kept a diary and that Franklin himself had once donated money for the construction of a synagogue in Philadelphia.

He is the grandfather of film historian Charles Musser. He is the great-grandfather of Hannah Zeavin, Associate Professor of History at University of California-Berkeley.
