= Clarence G. Child =

American scholar of medieval literature (1864–1948)

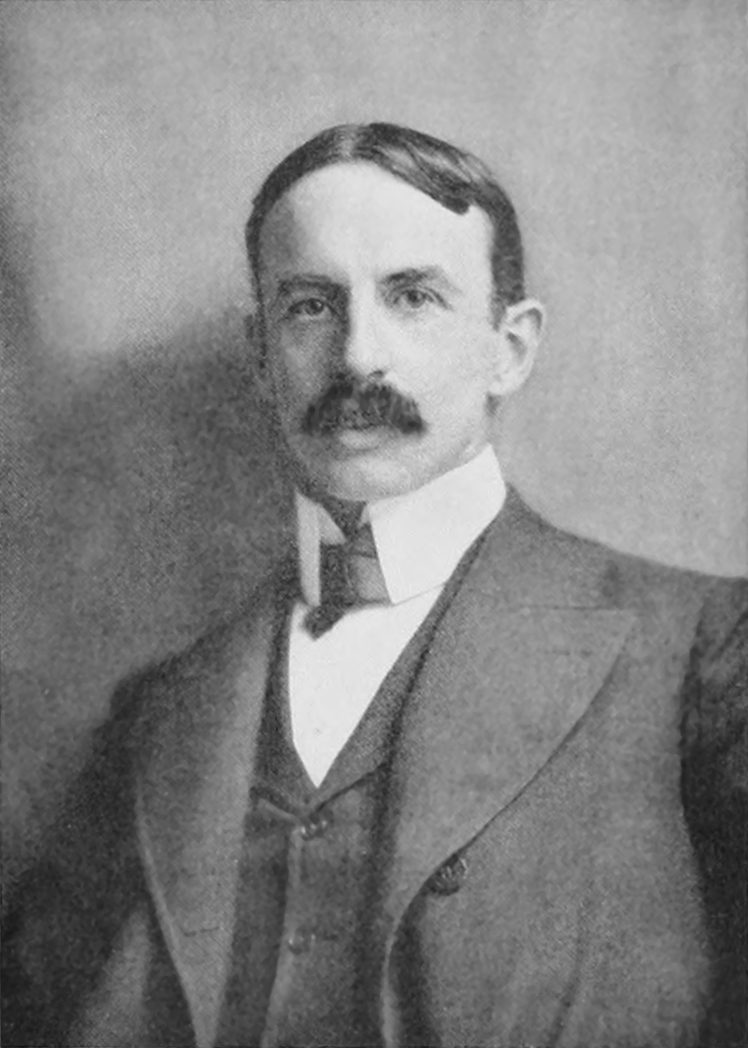
- Child pictured in about 1900
- Born: Clarence Griffin Child; March 22, 1864; Newport, Rhode Island
- Died: September 20, 1948 (aged 84); Norristown, Pennsylvania
- Occupations: Educator & scholar
- Known for: dean of the graduate school of the University of Pennsylvania
- Spouse: Elizabeth Reynolds
- Awards: L.H.D. (hon) Trinity (1902); LL.D. (hon) Pennsylvania (1930)

Academic background
- Education: B.A. Trinity (1886); M.A. Trinity (1891); Ph.D. Johns Hopkins (1895)

Academic work
- Discipline: English literature
- Sub-discipline: Medieval literature

Clarence Griffin Child (March 22, 1864, Newport, RI, US – September 20, 1948, Norristown, PA, US) was an American educator, scholar of medieval literature, and hobbyist mathematician who served as dean of the graduate school of the University of Pennsylvania.

== Early life and education ==
Born in Newport, Rhode Island, to Rev. William Spencer Child and Jessie Isabella Davis, Child received his undergraduate education at Trinity College, Connecticut, where he was initiated into Psi Upsilon and elected to Phi Beta Kappa. He went on to complete a master's degree at Trinity, remaining there briefly afterwards to teach mathematics, which was his long-time hobby. He subsequently studied at the Ludwig-Maximilians-Universität München and Johns Hopkins University, receiving his Ph.D. from the latter university where his dissertation focused on the use of palatal sounds in Old English.

== Career ==
In 1896, Child was appointed an instructor in English at the University of Pennsylvania and, from 1904 to 1907, served as dean of Pennsylvania's graduate school. As a professor of English, his popular lectures were known for their animated "histrionics and pantomime". Child's 1904 translation of Beowulf, published by Houghton Mifflin for reading by children and the public, was described by the Sewanee Review as of a "literary quality which is rare in work of this character".

Child was an assistant editor of the New Worcester's Dictionary, served on the executive committee of the Simplified Spelling Board, and was elected to the American Philosophical Society. In 1902, he was given an honorary doctor of humane letters by Trinity College and was awarded an honorary doctor of letters by the University of Pennsylvania in 1930. Child retired from active teaching in 1938 to occupy the university's John Walsh Centennial Chair of History and English Literature as emeritus professor of English.

== Personal life ==
Clarence Child married Elizabeth Reynolds on June 20, 1899, and, with her, had two children.
