= Justin Winsor Prize (history) =

The Justin Winsor Prize was awarded by the American Historical Association to encourage new authors to pursue the study of history in the Western Hemisphere at a time when the study of European history predominated. The award was established in 1896 and named for Justin Winsor (1831–1897), one of the founders and presidents of the American Historical Association and the long-time Librarian of Harvard University. The award was discontinued in 1938. The American Historical Association's Justin Winsor Prize is not to be confused with the present-day Justin Winsor Prize awarded annually by the Library History Round Table of the American Library Association for the best library history essay.

== Award winners ==
Annual awards

- 1896 Herman Vandenburg Ames, The Proposed Amendments to the Constitution of the United States
- 1897 No award
- 1898 No award
- 1899 No award
- 1900 William A. Schaper, Sectionalism and Representation in South Carolina
- 1901 Ulrich B. Phillips, (1877–1934) Georgia and State Rights
- 1902 Charles McCarthy, (1873–1921) The Anti-Masonic Party
- 1903 Louise Phelps Kellogg, (1862–1942) The American Colonial Charter; A Study of Its Relation to English Administration, Chiefly After 1688
- 1904 William R. Manning, The Nootka Sound Controversy
- 1905 No award
- 1906 Annie Heloise Abel Henderson , (1860–1939)The History of Events Resulting in Indian Consolidation West of the Mississippi River

Biennial awards

- 1908 Clarence Edwin Carter, Great Britain and the Illinois Country, 1765–1774
- 1910 Edward Raymond Turner, (1881–1929) The Negro in Pennsylvania; Slavery—Servitude—Freedom, 1639–1861
- 1912 Arthur Charles Cole, (1886–1976)The Whig Party in the South
- 1914 Mary Wilhelmine Williams, (1878–1944) Anglo-American Isthmian Diplomacy, 1815–1915
- 1916 Richard J. Purcell, Connecticut in Transition, 1775–1818
- 1918 Arthur M. Schlesinger, (1888–1965) The Colonial Merchants and the American Revolution, 1736–1776
- 1920 Frank Lee Benns, (1889–1867) The American Struggle for the British West India Carrying Trade, 1815–1830
- 1922 Lawrence Henry Gipson, (1880–1971) Jared Ingersoll: A Study of American Loyalism in Relation to British Colonial Government
- 1924 Elizabeth B. White, History of Franco-American Diplomatic Relations
- 1926 Lowell Joseph Ragatz, (1897–1978) The Fall of the Planter Class in the British Caribbean, 1763–1833
- 1928 Fred Albert Shannon, (1893–1963) The Organization and Administration of the Union Army, 1861–1865, 2 vols
- 1930 L.W. Labaree, Royal Government in America: A Study of the British Colonial System Before 1783

Reinstituted award

- 1937 Carl Bridenbaugh, (1903–1992) Cities in the Wilderness: The First Century of Urban. Life in America, 1625–1742

== See also ==
- List of history awards
