= James King (pioneer) =

Scottish-Australian winemaker (1800–1857)

James King (1800 – 29 November 1857) was a Scottish-Australian who was important in the establishment of the wine industry in Australia.

== Biography ==
King left Scotland in 1826 and arrived in Sydney early in 1827. King set up a business in "King Street" Sydney, including glass and other merchandise that he had brought with him. He had previously been employed in a glass factory in Edinburgh.

In 1828 King received a grant of 2000 acres (8 km^{2}) of land on the Williams River in the Hunter Region north of Sydney, which became his estate of 'Irrawang'. He also worked as a merchant in Sydney where he engaged in whaling and shipping ventures.

By 1836 King had established his vineyard and produced the first wine.

King died in London on 29 November 1857. He left a widow Eliza Elflida née Millner (1812–1887) who afterwards married William Roberts of Penrith
