= Alfred Hodder =

American author, attorney, and academic (1866–1907)

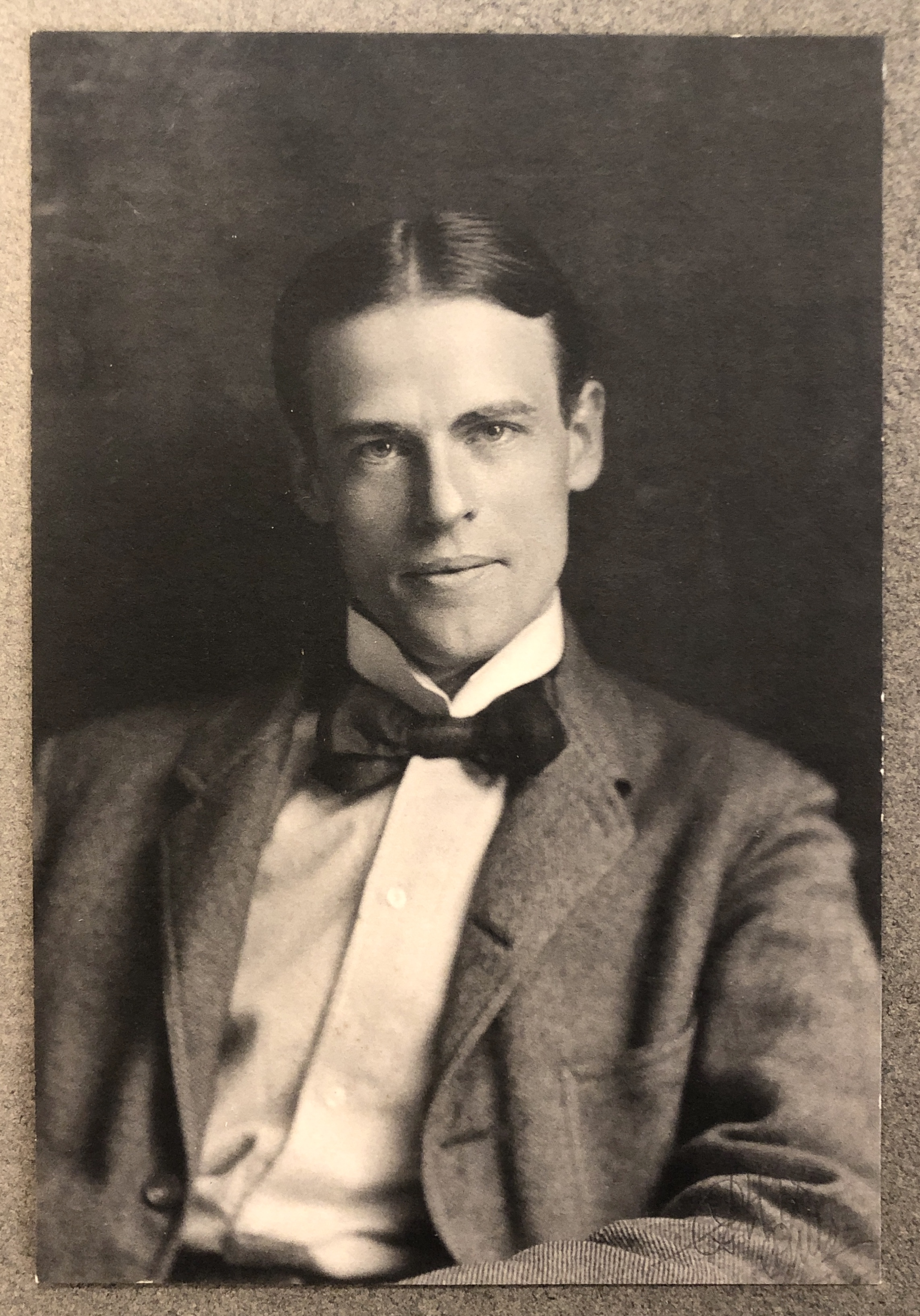
Alfred LeRoy Hodder circa 1890

Alfred LeRoy Hodder (September 18, 1866 – March 3, 1907) was an American author, attorney, Bryn Mawr College professor, private secretary to Manhattan District Attorney William Travers Jerome, muckraking journalist, and voice of the Progressive movement.

A bestselling novelist in the early 20th century, Hodder was friends with many influential thinkers of the time, including Leo Stein, Josiah Flynt Willard, and Hutchins Hapgood. He is perhaps best known today for his part in a love quadrangle that rocked the early years of Bryn Mawr College where, known as the "Byron of Bryn Mawr", he was a professor from 1895 to 1898. This love scandal involved Hodder; his common-law wife, pianist Jessie Donaldson Hodder; his boss, the powerful women's educator and Bryn Mawr Dean and President Martha Carey Thomas; and his colleague, Professor Mary (Mamie) Mackall Gwinn, the longtime live-in lover of President Thomas. The scandal threatened the legitimacy of President Thomas's tenure. Gertrude Stein fictionalized this complicated love quadrangle in her first novel, written around 1904 but published by Alice B. Toklas only after Stein's death, entitled Fernhurst: The History of Phillip Redfern, A Student of the Nature of Women, with Hodder as the inspiration for Phillip Redfern. Stein later expanded this plot in her thousand-page magnum opus, The Making of Americans, published in 1925.

== Life ==
Born in Celina, Ohio, but growing up in Cincinnati, Hodder left home at 19 and headed west to Denver. There, he worked for U.S. Senator Henry M. Teller, focusing on corruption in local municipalities. Without any formal undergraduate education, he became an attorney at the age of twenty-three, whereupon he decided to enroll at Harvard University as a graduate student in philosophy. At Harvard, he became the protégé of professors William James and Josiah Royce.

Hodder moved to Germany and studied at the universities of Freiburg and Leipzig from 1892 to 1895, publishing several translations of German philosophical essays while continuing work on his Harvard Ph.D. He returned to the U.S. in 1895 and was hired to teach at Bryn Mawr College by M. Carey Thomas, thanks to a letter of recommendation from Professor William James. Hodder lectured in English literature at Bryn Mawr from 1895 to 1898, receiving his Ph.D. in philosophy from Harvard in June, 1897, after the acceptance of his dissertation—later published as a book—titled Adversaries of a Sceptic. The Harvard Ph.D. was the only degree he ever received.

After leaving Bryn Mawr College in 1898, Hodder moved to New York City to be a writer, and also to resume his fight against corruption in the workings of city municipalities as the private secretary to District Attorney William Travers Jerome. He lived there until his death in 1907, publishing four books and numerous short stories and articles.

Alfred Hodder was the great-grandson of Captain James Riley, author of the memoir Sufferings in Africa.

== Controversy ==
Alfred Hodder was the common-law husband of Jessie Donaldson Hodder, but while she was living in Europe with their two young children, waiting for him to join them, he instead married Professor Gwinn in 1904. Jessie Hodder returned to the US in 1906 after the death of their daughter in Switzerland and sued Alfred for bigamy.

Hodder died mysteriously in a New York City jail, weeks before what was to be a highly publicized trial. Mrs. Jessie Hodder managed to go on to a stellar career as a feminist and one of the world's leaders in prison reform, while Mrs. Mamie Gwinn Hodder, an heiress, spent the rest of her life as a recluse, eventually bequeathing her fortune to Princeton University.

== Published works ==
- The Adversaries of the Sceptic, or, The Specious Present: a New Inquiry into Human Knowledge (1901), The MacMillan Company. Hodder's 1897 dissertation in philosophy.
- The New Americans, or, Palimpsest (1901), The Macmillan Company. A novel about a modern American marriage, which became a bestseller.
- The Powers that Prey (1900), McClure, Phillips & Co. Hodder and his co-author, friend Josiah Flynt Willard, published this exposé of Tammany Hall under pseudonyms.
- A Fight for the City (1903), The MacMillan Company. The story of William Jerome's municipal campaign for District Attorney.
- "An Anachronism in Courtship" (1900), Harper's Magazine.
