= Lancaster Industrial School for Girls =

- U.S. National Register of Historic Places
- U.S. Historic district
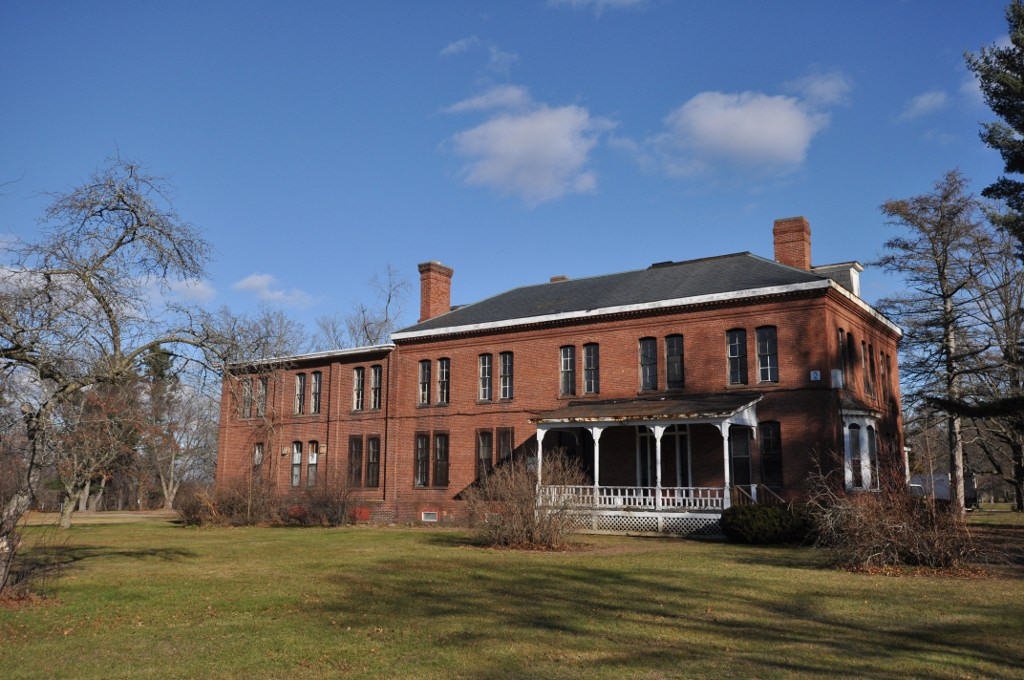

- Location within Massachusetts Location within the United States
- Location: Old Common Rd., Lancaster, Massachusetts
- Coordinates: 42°26′35″N 71°39′30″W
- Area: 70 acres (28 ha)
- Built: 1790
- Architectural style: Italianate, Federal
- NRHP reference No.: 76000301
- Added to NRHP: October 8, 1976

The Lancaster Industrial School for Girls was a reform school on Old Common Road in Lancaster, Massachusetts. It was the country's first state reform school for girls, opening on August 26, 1856. The facility provided its charges with separate rooms, arranged in three-story cottages with kitchen, dining, and other public facilities on the ground floor, rooms for the girls and a housemother on the second, and space for teachers on the third floor. This school paved the way of social reform, moving away from child imprisonment towards a correctional paradigm. This was in part achieved because of the observed benefits of environmental change in children, as well as the importance of education plus the added pressures of having to deal with the rise in child delinquency brought by social changes of the industrial age. After its closure in 1975, it was redeveloped into Massachusetts Correctional Institution - Lancaster. The campus was listed on the National Register of Historic Places in 1976.

== Campus ==
The Lancaster School's campus is located southeast of the town center, on 70 acres (28 ha) of landscaped terrain between Old Common Road (to the south) and Still River Road (Massachusetts Route 110) to the north. The campus includes eighteen historic buildings, dating from the late 18th to early 20th centuries. Many of its purpose-built buildings from this period are of brick construction, and most of those date to the period of the school's founding in the 1850s. There are three wood-frame buildings on the campus from the 18th century, all farmhouses which were standing when the state acquired the land. These buildings were used by the school for staff housing and offices.

A number of the buildings are residential "cottages", which had common spaces on the ground floor, and sleeping arrangements for both students and staff. The common spaces included a dining room, kitchen, sewing room, laundry, parlor, and classroom.

== See also ==
- Marcus Ames, one of the school's headmasters
- National Register of Historic Places listings in Worcester County, Massachusetts

== Sources ==
- Places Where Women Made History, National Park Service, available at: http://www.nps.gov/nr/travel/pwwmh/ma43.htm
- Lancaster Industrial School For Girls: A Social Portrait of a Nineteenth-century Reform School for Girls, Barbara Brenzel, available at JSTOR
- Daughters of the State: A Social Portrait of the First Reform School for Girls in North America, 1856-1905, Barbara Brenzel
