= Who Is Lydia Loveless? =

- Directed by: Gorman Bechard
- Produced by: Gorman Bechard; Colleen McQuaid
- Starring: Lydia Loveless, Todd May, Benjamin Lamb, Jay Gasper, George Hondroulis
- Cinematography: Gorman Bechard; Sarah Hajtol, Taryn Welker
- Edited by: Gorman Bechard
- Production company: What Were We Thinking Films
- Release dates: April 7, 2016 (Columbus International Film and Video Festival)
- Running time: 110 minutes
- Country: United States
- Language: English

Who Is Lydia Loveless? is a 2016 documentary film by Gorman Bechard that chronicles the making of musician Lydia Loveless's 2016 album Real, as well as following her on the road and looking into what life is like for a band in the music industry. "I also wanted to look at stuff we normally don't see a lot of. What are the finances for a band like this? Where does the money go? Who gets the money? Is Spotify good? Is Spotify bad? How does piracy affect you? What about the fans? I really wanted to go into all of that for a band that can sell out 200- or 250-seat venues and bars but is still traveling in an old Ford van. A good night is when they have a couple of hotel rooms. No one is rolling in the dough, so to speak. So what is it at that point when you have amazing critical success and acclaim but you’re not there yet?" In October 2015, Bechard and his crew filmed a live Lydia Loveless concert at Skully's in her hometown of Columbus for the documentary.

Two trailers exist for the film. One features Loveless and her band, while the other features random people trying to answer the question posed in the film's title.

== History ==
Who Is Lydia Loveless? is the fourth rock documentary by Bechard, whose previous documentaries include Color Me Obsessed, What Did You Expect?, and Every Everything: The Music, Life & Times of Grant Hart.

== Release ==
Film screenings include the following:

Sneak-peek/work-in-progress screening, Big Sky Documentary Film Festival, February 24, 2016

World Premiere, Columbus International Film & Video Festival, April 7, 2016

Screening, CIMMfest, Chicago, April 16, 2016

Screening, Cat's Cradle, Chapel Hill, May 14, 2016

Screening, New Haven Documentary Film Festival, June 7, 2016

DVD release, November 24, 2017

== Critical response ==
Writing in No Depression, Steve Wosahla said, "In the documentary, we get a look at the introspective artist as she allows us access into the making of her album Real (2016). As the film follows the progress of a new song, the band’s first rehearsal, and its recording session a few weeks later, we also get to experience it performed publicly for the first time. Director Gorman Bechard generously profiles each of her band members to get at the chemistry and passion they have in committing to playing behind her and the songs she writes."

The music blog If It's Too Loud had this to say: "Who is Lydia Loveless? is a great look into the everyday activities of one of our favorite up-and-coming artists. You see their everyday struggles and accomplishments in a very real way. It's not just for fans of Lydia Loveless, but for anyone looking to see what the careers of non-millionaire musicians can really be like... it takes the standard rock documentary format and goes in a completely new direction."
