= Pizza: A Love Story =

- Poster
- Directed by: Gorman Bechard
- Produced by: Gorman Bechard; Dean Falcone; Colin M. Caplan
- Starring: Henry Winkler, Lyle Lovett, Dave Portnoy, Michael Bolton
- Cinematography: Gorman Bechard
- Edited by: Gorman Bechard; Brianna Marcosano
- Music by: Dean Falcone
- Production company: What Were We Thinking Films
- Distributed by: MVD Entertainment
- Release date: April 26, 2019 (IFFBoston)
- Running time: 85 minutes
- Country: United States
- Language: English

Pizza: A Love Story is a 2019 documentary film by filmmaker Gorman Bechard that tells the story of the evolution of this modern day food staple, the only pizza that can really be called “pizza," through the eyes and history of three very famous pizza restaurants.

In the 6 block radius of Wooster square lies the Holy Trinity of Pepe's, Sally’s, and Modern. These three pizza places are worshiped by everybody from Presidents to Rock Stars to Actors, and most importantly, to locals. The documentary features interviews with family members, lifelong fans, celebrities, politicians, and food critics, intercutting archival footage and vintage photographs, all to explain the passion, the long lines, and how New Haven, Connecticut became the pizza center of the universe.

Bechard and producers Colin M. Caplan and Dean Falcone worked on Pizza: A Love Story for over a decade..

It is in Pizza: A Love Story where Dave Portnoy, of Barstool Sports, first declared New Haven the Pizza Capital of the United States. Two years later he tweeted on X, "Let me settle this once and for all. The pizza capital of the United States is New Haven Ct. Anybody who says otherwise is wrong."

== History ==
Pizza: A Love Story is the eighth documentary by Bechard, whose previous documentaries include Color Me Obsessed, What Did You Expect?, and Every Everything: The Music, Life & Times of Grant Hart. Production of the film began in 2009 and was completed in 2019.

== Release ==
Film screenings include:

- IFFBoston, April 2019 - World Premiere
- Greenwich International Film Festival, June 2019
- NHdocs: the New Haven Documentary Film Festival, June 2019
- Woods Hole Film Festival, July 2019
- Sidewalk Film Festival, August 2019
- Hot Springs Documentary Film Festival, October 2019
- Bowtie Criterion Cinema, New Haven – theatrical run beginning 14 February 2020

The film was released on DVD in September 2020

== Reception ==
Deborah Brown of The Swellesley Report called Pizza: A Love Story, "An important film of staggering genius that needed to be made."

Writing in cinematic randomness, Kevin Bechaz said, "an in-depth, enlightening and a slightly tongue-in-cheek look what might just be the greatest gift from Italian migration."

Writing in Cinema Sentries, Elizabeth Periale said, "The only drawback to watching the film is that it will undoubtedly leave you hungry, and wondering how soon you can book a trip to New Haven, long lines or not."

And from CTMG.org, "This is a very important movie. Even though it took over a decade to complete and required some crowd-sourced funding, it is a movie that had to be made."
