= Where Are You, Jay Bennett? =

2021 American documentary film

- Directed by: Gorman Bechard; Fred Uhter
- Produced by: Fred Uhter; Gorman Bechard
- Production company: What Were We Thinking Films
- Release dates: November 15, 2021 (Chicago); April 19, 2022 (on DVD and BluRay)
- Running time: 105 minutes
- Country: United States
- Language: English

Where Are You, Jay Bennett? is a 2021 documentary film directed by Gorman Bechard and Fred Uhter. It is about the life of American musician Jay Bennett, best known for his work with the band Wilco.

== Production ==
Where Are You, Jay Bennett? is the sixth rock documentary by Bechard, whose previous music documentaries include Color Me Obsessed, What Did You Expect?, and Every Everything: The Music, Life & Times of Grant Hart.

== Release ==
The film had its world premiere at the Davis Theatre in Chicago on November 15, 2021.

It was released on DVD and BluRay on April 19, 2022 , and as a special edition Record Store Day 2022 release packaged with Bennett's last two albums being released on vinyl for the first time.

== Reception ==
In the Loop Magazine wrote, "Where Are You, Jay Bennett? is one of the most intimate portraits of a musician ever filmed."

Writing in Americana Highways, Steve Wosahla said,"The new film does a wonderful job of capturing the quirkiness, inventiveness and brilliance of someone who never met an instrument he couldn't play."

In a New York Times article, Lindsay Zoladz quoted Bechard and wrote, "Personally, I wish they had stayed together because I think they could have literally become the next Lennon and McCartney or the next Jagger/Richards, Bechard said in an interview promoting his documentary. After spending time with this exhaustive boxed set, though, I can't possibly imagine a universe where that version of Wilco could have stayed together long enough to make that happen."

Jeremy Porter in Pencil Storm wrote, "The underlying theme of the movie is Jay's talent as a musician. His contributions to Wilco's second and third albums Being There and Summerteeth propelled them into another universe."

In The Medium, Keith R. Higgons wrote, "If you're a Wilco fan and have seen the Sam Jones documentary I Am Trying To Break Your Heart . . . it's required viewing to watch Where are you, Jay Bennett? — Bechard's film is the ballast to Jones' film. It provides much needed context to the Wilco/Yankee Hotel Foxtrot story and drama."
