= Gorman Bechard =

American novelist (born 1959)

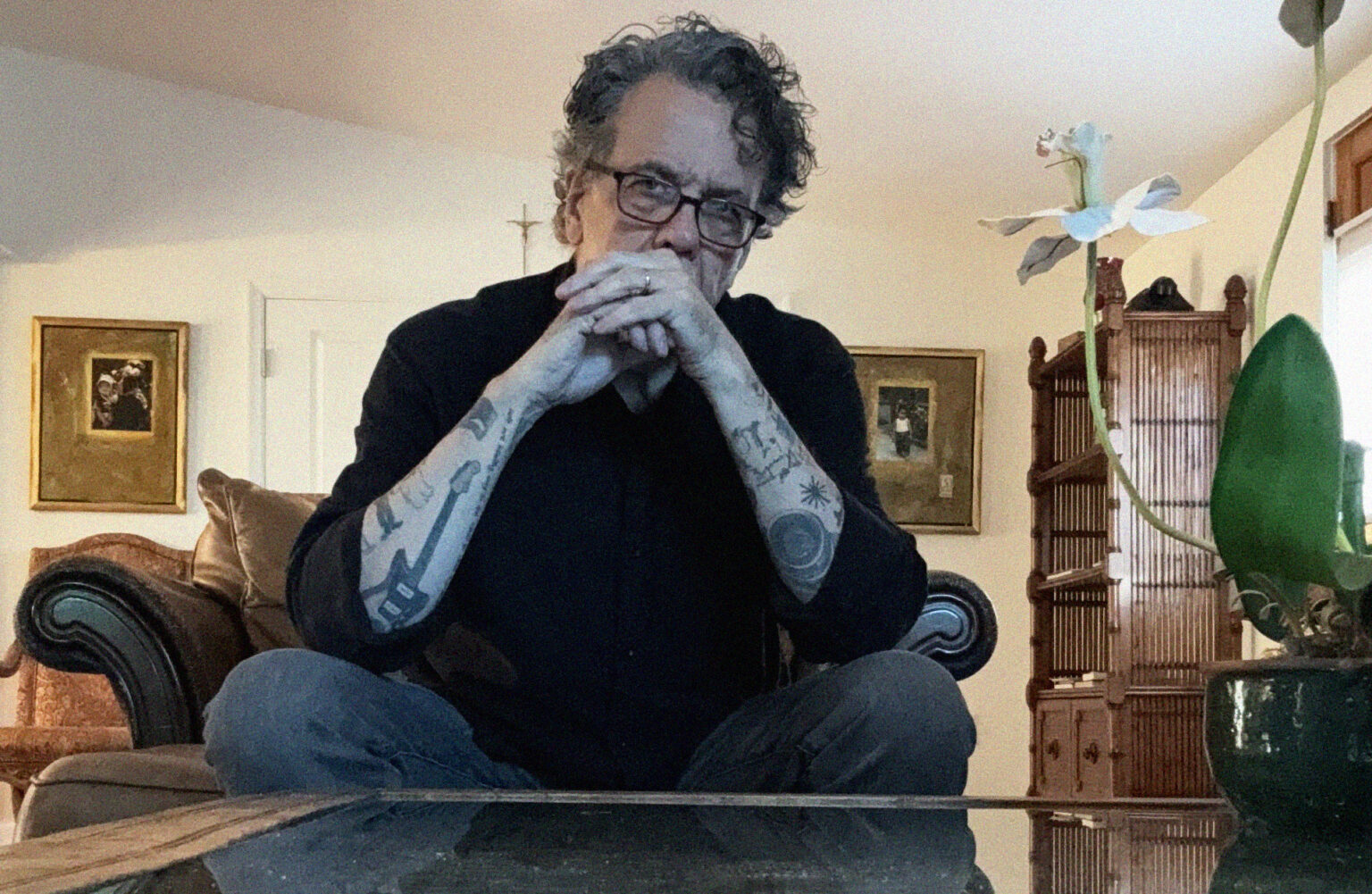
- Bechard in 2024
- Born: Gorman E. Bechard III; March 15, 1959 (age 67); Waterbury, Connecticut, U.S.
- Other name: Jonathan Baine
- Education: New School for Social Research
- Occupations: Filmmaker; Novelist; Screenwriter
- Years active: 1983–present
- Known for: Color Me Obsessed, Psychos In Love, Who Is Lydia Loveless?, Pizza A Love Story, Seniors A Dogumentary
- Website: gormanbechard.com

Gorman Bechard (born March 15, 1959) is an American film director, screenwriter and novelist best known for his independent feature films Psychos in Love, Friends (with benefits), and You Are Alone; his four rock documentaries Color Me Obsessed: A Film About the Replacements, What Did You Expect? The Archers of Loaf Live at Cat's Cradle, Every Everything: The Music, Life & Times of Grant Hart, and Who is Lydia Loveless?; his animal welfare documentary A Dog Named Gucci; and his debut novel The Second Greatest Story Ever Told.

== Early life ==
Bechard was born in Waterbury, Connecticut, to Gorman "Gary" E. Bechard Jr., a bar and restaurant entrepreneur, and Lucille Claire Bechard. Lucille died when Bechard was 10 years old, so he and his sister Deborah were raised by his grandparents, William and Claire Roberts. He also has two half-brothers, Thomas and Sean.

Bechard graduated from Holy Cross High School in Waterbury. While in high school, Bechard became interested in writing after reading Kurt Vonnegut’s Breakfast of Champions and Richard Brautigan’s In Watermelon Sugar. He attended Western Connecticut State University, where he studied journalism.

Bechard worked as the music critic for the Waterbury Republican & American newspaper and started a local music fanzine called Imagine.

In 1980, he played guitar and sang lead in a New Haven-based pop/punk band called The Grubbies. They released two EPs.

In 1981, Bechard took a course on director Alfred Hitchcock at the New School for Social Research in New York City, and shortly thereafter found himself studying 16mm film production and taking uncredited courses part time there.

== Early films ==
=== Disconnected ===
1983, Bechard shot his first feature film, Disconnected, while still studying film in New York City. Made on a budget of $40,000 and filmed in his native Waterbury, it was a creepy take on the horror movement of the time. A restored version of this film was released on Blu-ray by Vinegar Syndrome on November 24, 2017. His long-lost first documentary, Twenty Questions, was included as an extra on the Blu-ray release. The film was re-issued on VHS in July 2025.

=== Psychos in Love ===
Bechard's next film, 1986's Psychos in Love, was a horror comedy that has been called "the first Scream." Conceived as a slasher film in the style of Woody Allen, Monty Python and the Marx Brothers, Bechard's film went on to play a midnight run at the famed Bleecker Street Cinema in Greenwich Village before being released on video by Empire Pictures. In HorrorNews.Net, Todd Martin wrote, "It's violent and gory while being sweet and funny at the same time and after everything was said and done I ended up digging it a lot more than I ever thought that I would." A restored version of Psychos in Love was released on Blu-ray from Vinegar Syndrome on September 26, 2017. In Letterboxd, Mondo Cinema wrote, "This is the best time I've ever had watching a slasher flick." The film was re-issued on VHS in July 2025.

Bechard entered into a four-picture deal with Empire Pictures that was fraught with conflict. Empire went out of business, and Bechard, having had enough, shifted his career to writing novels and scripts.

== Novels ==
=== The Second Greatest Story Ever Told ===
Bechard's first novel, The Second Greatest Story Ever Told, was published by Citadel Underground in 1991 and was called "a very, very funny book" by the Los Angeles Times. It tells the tale of God sending his quirky teenaged daughter to save the world. The book has been optioned by Hollywood numerous times, and has had many leading actress attached to play the role including Winona Ryder, who in the Hot issue of Rolling Stone magazine proclaimed her next role was playing the female Jesus, to most recently Rooney Mara, who can be seen on the cover of the paperback release of the novel.

=== The Hazmat Diary ===
In 1993, long before the widespread availability of broadband internet, he produced a multi-media web novel called The Hazmat Diary, which featured images, video clips, and music programmed in Flash. The site was eventually taken down in 2007, and the story was published in paperback form in 2010.

=== Balls ===
His next novel Balls was published by Penguin Books in 1995. It tells the fictional story of the first woman to play major league baseball. The book was optioned by 20th Century Fox but never made into a film.

=== Good Neighbors ===
Next came Good Neighbors, published by Carroll & Graf in 1998, of which Publishers Weekly said, "In his first mystery, novelist Bechard deftly captures the story's working-class neighborhood setting," adding "Bechard's ear for dark comedy and eye for social nuance are this book's strong suits."

=== Ninth Square ===
Of Ninth Square (Forge, 2003) Publishers Weekly said, "the suspense level remains high to the end, as Shute, suspended from the force, attracted to a female cop but entangled with one of the likable and believable hookers he encounters in the escort industry, strives to find all the answers."

=== Unwound ===
Unwound, written under the pseudonym Jonathan Baine, and published by Onyx in 2007. It tells the story of an author slowly losing his mind, or is he, as he believes one of his most famous characters has come to life and is stalking him.

=== Let it Be ===
Let it Be, written in 2018, and published to Bechard's substack in April 2025. In the introduction to the novel, he wrote: "Let it Be is a novel inspired by the classic Replacements record of the same name." The book tells the story of a female documentary filmmaker living in New Haven trying to figure out her life, loves, career, and discreetly placed tattoos.

=== Snow Blind ===
Snow Blind is a novel written in 1994/1995, right after Bechard's second book Balls, which ended up being published by Penguin Plume. "Snow Blind did not have the same luck as Balls," Bechard wrote. "It was a thriller with a female lead." The world wasn't ready for it and it lay "dormant in a computer folder for decades." Beginning on July 27, 2025, Snow Blind was being serialized on substack.

== Recent narrative films ==
=== The Kiss ===
In 2002, Bechard returned to filmmaking with The Kiss, starring Terence Stamp and Eliza Dushku. But once again the process made him question whether directing was a career path he wanted to travel.

=== You Are Alone ===
In 2005, Bechard decided to take one last stab at filmmaking. He would do a micro-budget film where all the control was in his hands. The film, You Are Alone, a dark drama exploring how far some people will go to feel less alone, went on to play numerous film festivals and win many "best-of" awards before being released on DVD. In Letterboxd, Keith Dwyer wrote, "You Are Alone has one of the best scripts that I've ever come across. It's dialogue is so visceral and really grabbed at my insides. It's a conversation that spans an hour and a half, and is an analytical look at how we deal with the parts of ourselves that we are disgusted by or fear to confront. There are flashback sequences that are interspersed within the main conversation sequences to provide context for the characters and they play out just like that of memory with how simply yet effectively they're edited. It's hard to say whether it will pack the same punch for everyone as it did for me, but it's floored me." You Are Alone was re-issued on a deluxe Blu-ray edition by Saturn's Core Video and Vinegar Syndrome in May 2025.

=== Friends (with benefits) ===
Bechard's next independent feature was 2009's Friends (With Benefits). The film likewise played many film festivals and is being distributed by Cinetic Media. In Letterboxd, Monsieur Flynn wrote, "It's got the heart, the non PG-13 realism in nudity, the soundtrack to give additional value, the real human feel of flawed relationships, friendships and fear of the next step, and it brings funny to the table without the awkward Hollywood-takes. It's just an enjoyable trip into a terrain that never really surprise you, but yet is so heartfelt and true it's easy to get lost in."

=== Broken Side of Time ===
His last narrative film, 2013's Broken Side of Time, premiered at VisionFest in New York City in June 2013, and won the Audience Choice Award for Best Narrative Feature at CineKink 2014. It was released on DVD and streaming media in May 2014. In Blurt, Danny Phillips wrote, "Watching Dolce's slip into the abyss is somewhat like watching a car stranded on the tracks as a train barrels towards it. You really want to help, to scream 'Get out of the way!' but deep inside we want to see what happens next. Broken Side of Time is a look at a journey and a destination, a glimpse at what happens when you give all yourself to something and are used, tossed aside in return. Dolce is a train wreck personified and I could not stop watching."

== Documentaries ==
=== Color Me Obsessed, a film about The Replacements ===
Color Me Obsessed, Bechard's first documentary is about legendary 80s indie rock band the Replacements. Called "the rock version of Rashomon" by the Village Voice, and one of "the seven best new music documentaries of the year" by Rolling Stone, the film has been playing the film festival and arthouse circuit since its premiere in March 2011. It was released on DVD in November 2012, and then on VHS in July 2025. Though the film "hasn't a single second of their music, zero interviews with surviving band members and only briefly shows a few photos of the band at its ending, Color Me Obsessed: A Film About the Replacements manages to be one of the best documentaries on any subject I've seen this year."

=== What Did You Expect? the Archers of Loaf love at Cat's Cradle ===
Bechard's film What Did You Expect? is a concert documentary capturing Archers of Loaf on their recent reunion tour. The film had its world premiere at the NXNE Festival in Toronto in June 2012, and was released on DVD in November 2012. In 2015, the band released the double album Curse of the Loaf, which is the Brian Paulson-produced concert audio from Bechard's documentary. The deluxe package also featured a copy of the film.

=== Every Everything: the music, life & times of Grant Hart ===
Every Everything: The Music, Life & Times of Grant Hart is a documentary on Grant Hart of the legendary 80s indie rock band Hüsker Dü, premiered in London at the Raindance Film Festival and in New York City at the CBGB Festival in October 2013, and was the opening-night film of the Sound Unseen Film & Music Festival in Minneapolis/St. Paul in November. In Tiny Mix Tapes, Paul Bower wrote, "Grant Hart is weird because he kind of gets how important he was for rock & roll and at the same time he doesn't understand what all the fuss is about. While it's a cliche to even bring it up, he has a definite Minnesota Nice quality in regard to discussing what he's done with his artistic career and how much what he's done might have influenced the world of modern Western music. Parts of Every Everything are frustrating, but they're frustrating because the film's subject himself is quintessentially frustrating. Bechard has done that rare thing in documentary filmmaking. He's fully allowed his subject to dictate the tone of the film. As an audience, we’re better off because of it." While in PopShifter, Chelsea Spear said, "Throughout Every Everything, Bechard paints a very human portrait of Grant Hart, who comes off as self-aware and clear-eyed after a series of setbacks and bad decisions. Ultimately, the film could illustrate another truism: 'living well is the best revenge.'" In Letterboxd, Larry Yoshida writes, "This is the film I want to force all those mall punks and "I'm so Alternative" hipsters to watch."

=== A Dog Named Gucci ===
In 2015 Bechard directed and co-produced with his wife Kristine Bechard the feature A Dog Named Gucci, a documentary about animal abuse and the laws regarding such abuse in the United States, The story of Gucci is set in Mobile, Alabama, where "some local thugs got angry at a 15-year-old runaway girl because she wouldn't do sexual favors for them. So they set her 10-week-old dog on fire. A professor down the street, Doug James, saw the flames and saved the dog, Gucci, by dousing them. Then he took in the dog, nursing him back to health with the help of a veterinarian. The thugs were caught, but the ringleader got a prison sentence of just six months. James was so incensed that he fought to get a state law passed to make such an offense a felony. Six years later, he succeeded." The film had its world premiere at the Big Sky Documentary Film Festival in February 2015. The film was released on DVD from MVD Entertainment in April 2016. The end-credits song from the film, "One Voice," features the talents of Norah Jones, Aimee Mann, Susanna Hoffs, Lydia Loveless, Neko Case, Kathryn Calder, and Brian May. The single was released on Record Store Day, April 16, 2016, with the proceeds going to benefit animal charities.

=== Who is Lydia Loveless? ===
Bechard has also just completed a documentary on singer-songwriter Lydia Loveless called Who is Lydia Loveless?, in which he documents the making of Loveless's album Real (2016), as well as following her on the road and looking into what life is life for a band at her level in the music industry. "I also wanted to look at stuff we normally don't see a lot of. What are the finances for a band like this? Where does the money go? Who gets the money? Is Spotify good? Is Spotify bad? How does piracy affect you? What about the fans? I really wanted to go into all of that for a band that can sell out 200- or 250-seat venues and bars but is still traveling in an old Ford van. A good night is when they have a couple of hotel rooms. No one is rolling in the dough, so to speak. So what is it at that point when you have amazing critical success and acclaim but you're not there yet?" In October 2015, Bechard and his crew filmed a live Lydia Loveless concert at Skully's in her hometown of Columbus for the documentary. The film had its world premiere at the Columbus International Film & Video Festival on April 7, 2016. The documentary was released on DVD and streaming media on November 24, 2017. Modern Vinyl said of the film, "Shot with Loveless and her band while on tour and recording her album Real, the film takes a hard look at what it's like to be a musician in these modern times. It notably addresses the financial aspects of playing rock ‘n’ roll in an age of Spotify and YouTube, and what that means for someone's bottom line. Who Is Lydia Loveless? is the sort of documentary that gets inside the whys and wherefores of music, while also adding in some rather excellent performance footage, shot both on tour and at a ripping show at Skully's in Columbus, Ohio. It's heartfelt and honest, told in the words of those involved in bringing Loveless’ brutally honest music to life. While label folks and producers speak, there are no discussions with fans or family — this is a film about the music."

=== What it Takes: film en douze tableaux ===
Bechard also revealed during an iCRVradio interview on May 2, 2017 with Robin Andreoli that he had begun work on a rock documentary about North Carolina alt-country band Sarah Shook and the Disarmers called What It Takes: film en douze tableaux. The film, edited in the style of the Jean-Luc Godard film from which it takes half its name, had its world premiere at Independent Film Festival Boston in April 2018. The film also played the Rock and Roll Hall of Fame in August of that same year, and was released on DVD on November 9, 2018. As the music blog If It's Too Loud says, "What makes Gorman Bechard's documentaries truly work for my is that he takes these high falutin' film concepts and uses them for film documentaries. Film documentaries are typically put out by a record company as a way to cash in on an artist and are little more than fluff pieces, or they focus on drama within a band. What it Takes: film en douze tableaux doesn't do any of that. While Bechard is an obvious fan of his subject, he shows them as is, and doesn't try to show them glossed over or hyped up."

=== Twenty Questions ===
It was also announced that a long-thought-lost first documentary from Bechard called Twenty Questions would have its world premiere at the New Haven Documentary Film Festival in June 2017. In the 60-minute film originally shot in 1987 and never screened publicly, twenty people, from all walks of life, are each locked alone in a room for the length of one 400-foot roll of 16mm film (11 minutes). They are each given the same set of twenty questions, which they can answer at random...if they're not completely distracted by their surroundings. The film is a featured extra on the Blu-ray release of his first feature Disconnected.

=== Pizza, A Love Story ===
Directed by Bechard, and co-produced with long-time musical collaborator Dean Falcone and New Haven historian Colin M. Caplan, Pizza A Love Story is just that, a love story to New Haven's holy trinity of pizza restaurants, Pepe's, Sally's, and Modern, had its world premiere at IFFBoston in April 2019. It screened at a number of films festivals including the Greenwich International Film Festival, NHdocs: the New Haven Documentary Film Festival, Sidewalk Film Festival, the Woods Hole Film Festival, and the Hot Springs Documentary Film Festival in 2019. The film was released on DVD and pay-per-view on September 29, 2020. In reviewing the film, Deborah Brown of The Swellesley Report called it “An important film of staggering genius that needed to be made.” While in Letterboxd, Michael Viers writes, "What could have very easily been a bunch of people gate-keeping pizza turned into a very weird, funny documentary full of pizza nerds."

=== Seniors A Dogumentary ===
In May 2017, Bechard also launched a Kickstarter for a new animal documentary, this one called Seniors A Dogumentary, that celebrates the brains, energy & sass of some of the coolest senior dogs on this planet and the people who love them. The film premiered on March 5, 2020, at the Belcourt Theatre in Nashville. The film "is a documentary by Gorman Bechard with three interwoven stories that include Old Friends Senior Dog Sanctuary, which cares for about 90 senior dogs on-site with about 300 more placed in foster homes" and also highlights the late Chaser (dog) the Border Collie, referred to as the smartest dog in the world, and Jane Sobel Klonsky, whose work has included capturing the bond between elderly dogs and their owners." Released on DVD and pay-per-view on September 29, 2020, the film received rave reviews. Robin in Reeling Reviews writes, "Documentary writer-director-participant Gorman Bechard does just what I expected when I started watching “Seniors.” He takes a subject matter that, on the surface, might turn off potential viewers. A documentary about old dogs and their last days should be a bummer, but not here. Here we have a true life story about love, dignity and the quality of life for our old canine friends." While Pam Powell in The Daily Journal says, "Watching this film will change how you see dogs, and perhaps even your own buddy, thanks to Bechard’s keen perspective bringing this film to life." and adds, "Yes, you’ll need a tissue or two, but be prepared for many more involuntary smiles that go from ear to ear."

=== The Matchbox Man ===
Directed by Bechard, and his first short film in decades, it tells the story of Charlie Mack, who has one of the world's premiere collection of Matchbox (brand) cars, over 42,000, on display, in his home. The film was released on DVD and streaming on January 18, 2022.

=== Where are you, Jay Bennett? ===
Co-Directed by Bechard and Fred Uhter, Where are you, Jay Bennett? "delves into the life and career of Jay Bennett. The extremely talented musician was a crucial member of Wilco during the band’s formative years. Unceremoniously dumped from Wilco by Jeff Tweedy, the studio wizard and guitarist would go on to a solo career before succumbing to an accidental Fentanyl overdose at the age of 45." The film had its world premiere in Chicago in November 2021, then was released on Blu-ray and pay-per-view on April 19, 2022, and as part of a Record Store Day released with vinyl editions of Bennett's last two albums, "Whatever Happened I Apologize" and "Kicking at the Perfumed Air" on April 23, 2022, "the new film does a wonderful job of capturing the quirkiness, inventiveness and brilliance of someone who never met an instrument he couldn’t play." The film was originally started by Uhter, who asked Bechard to take over the project when it stalled. It takes a hard look at Bennett's years in Wilco, and his treatment in the film I Am Trying To Break Your Heart, which many consider to be unfair. "Jay Bennett’s reputation never quite recovered from the battering it took in Sam Jones’ documentary I Am Trying To Break Your Heart: A Film About Wilco. Filmmakers Gorman Bechard and Fred Uhter seek to redress the balance on Where Are You, Jay Bennett?" The film paints a balanced picture of the relationship between Bennett and Tweedy. "They just happened to be two egos at that point, fueled by a lot of demons. And it just wasn't working anymore," Bechard explained. "They're both incredibly talented. They both had egos. They both, I think, saw maybe different paths for the band. And ultimately it was Jeff's band, so he's going to win that, and rightfully so. There were other issues, whether it be alcohol or drugs. You know, it was a little bit of everything. Personally, I wish they had stayed together because I think they could have literally become the next Lennon and McCartney or the next Jagger/Richards."

=== Old Friends, A Dogumentary ===
In May 2021, an Indiegogo campaign was launched for Old Friends, A Dogumentary, a follow-up to his work in his documentary Seniors A Dogumentary. The film had its world premiere at the history Franklin Theatre in Franklin, Tennessee on April 27, 2022. The film tells the 10-year history of the Old Friends Senior Dog Sanctuary, from its humble beginnings as a back-yard rescue to becoming the preeminent senior dog care facility on the planet. The documentary, co produced with Sophia Rokas, marks the first time Bechard has turned over the film editing reigns to someone else, longtime protege Sydni Frisch. The film was released on DVD and streaming in December 2022.

=== Slice of America: Charred in the Florida Sun (episode 1) ===
During the summer of 2023, Bechard directed the pilot episode of a planned fish-out-of-water pizza series called Slice of America: Charred in the Florida Sun (episode 1). The first episode profiles Jimmy Fantin, who opens Fantini's “New Haven Style” Apizza in the small coastal town of Stuart, Florida. With the support of loyal Connecticut snowbirds jonesing for a slice of home, and a rave review from One Bite's Dave Portnoy, Fantini's thrives and becomes a hub for pizza in Florida, with pizza-lovers driving a hundred miles or more for just a taste of one of Jimmy's pies. The film was co-produced by Colin M. Calpan, and edited by Sydni Frisch, Bechard, and Faith Marek, with music from Dean Falcone. The film was released on DVD and streaming in December 2024.

=== Documentaries in production ===
In the summer of 2019, Bechard and producer, Bill Kraus, launched a Kickstarter campaign for FACTORY, a new feature-length documentary about the many varied and crazy lives of the New Haven Clock Company factory. Portions of the documentary were previewed in an exhibit at the New Haven Museum and Historical Society in February 2020. In an update on the film's Kickstarter page, Bechard wrote, "the film is 90% complete...just waiting for that ending," as the ground-breaking on renovations of the building have stalled due to issues with the developer.

In May 2022, Bechard launched a Kickstarter campaign for a documentary on the infamous Powder Ridge Rock Festival, titled Powder Ridge: sex, drugs, no rock & roll.

In July 2023, Bechard, along with co-producers Faith Marek and Kaity Bolding, began work on Best Video, the movie, a feature-length documentary about the importance of physical media and the dozen or so video stores around the country that are preserving the history of film. These include Best Video Film & Cultural Center in Hamden, CT, Scarecrow Video in Seattle, Movie Madness in Portland, VideoDrome in Atlanta, Beyond Video in Baltimore, Vidiots in LA, Videotheque in LA, and VisArt in Charlotte, NC.

== Music videos ==
In July 2016, two Bechard-directed music videos had their premiere in Rolling Stone magazine. The first was "Heal Me" from the album Sidelong by North Carolina musicians Sarah Shook and the Disarmers. A few days later, "Longer," from the fourth Lydia Loveless album, Real, was released. It is also the first official Loveless music video. And on August 19, the second Bechard-directed music video from Real was released for the song "Clumps." Noisey, the music division of Vice magazine, called it "simple and gorgeous."

In May 2017, another two Bechard-directed music videos were released back-to-back. The first, which was premiered by Diffuser.fm, was for "(I Just Died) Like an Aviator" for Matthew Ryan, which featured a group of teenaged girls lip-syncing and rocking out to the song. The video starred Chloe Barczak as the singer, Carina Begley as the guitar player, Chloe Lang as the bass player, and Erica Gonsiewski as the drummer. Realizing that having real teenagers behind the scenes as well as in front of the camera could only help the authenticity, Bechard brought on interns 17-year-old Charlotte Beatty and 15-year-old Isabella Germano to co-produce the video. American Songwriter Magazine wrote: "a coltish, all-girl band plays the parts of Ryan and co., rocking out in the confines of a dingy basement, and the result is oddly effective. The song takes on an added poignancy as a charismatic teenaged singer mouths lines like "I'm pouring a drink/ And smoking a smoke/ Our guts are born in that fiery trench/ Between hurt and hope" in the raspy, cigarette drawl of a middle-aged man."

The other music video for "Nothin' Feels Right But Doin' Wrong" by Sarah Shook and the Disarmers was premiered by Fader, for the Bloodshot Records re-release of the band's debut album, "Sidelong.".

2018 brought two new Bechard-directed music videos to the world: "The Bottle Never Lets Me Down" from Sarah Shook and the Disarmers was premiered by Rolling Stone, for the Bloodshot Records release of the band's second album, "Years", and American Songwriter premiered the video for the acoustic version of "I Just Died Like An Aviator" from Matthew Ryan (musician).

== NHdocs: the New Haven Documentary Film Festival ==
In 2014, Bechard co-founded NHdocs: the New Haven Documentary Film Festival (NHdocs), which he co-directs with Yale Film and Media Studies professor Charles Musser. The festival expanded from one day screening four films in 2014 to three days and over 20 films in 2015. In 2016, the festival expanded to 11 days, showing over 40 films, including Bechard's Who is Lydia Loveless? followed by a solo acoustic performance from Lydia Loveless. The 2017 version of the festival featured over 80 films and a tribute to the legendary D.A. Pennebaker. In 2018 the festival featured tributes to Amy Berg (documentary filmmaker), Su Friedrich, and HBO's Sheila Nevins. While in 2019, the sixth edition featured over 100 films, including the completed Pizza, A Love Story, and a weekend long tribute to documentarian Michael Moore, with Moore in attendance being interviewed about his work by friends Peter Davis, DA Pennebaker, and Chris Hegedus. The festival screened seven of his most famous films including Roger & Me, Bowling for Columbine, Where to Invade Next, Fahrenheit 9/11 and Fahrenheit 11/9.

In 2020, the festival moved to August due to COVID-19, but still screened over 120 films online and in-person, and also included a student competition, a quarantine film challenge, workshops, Q&As, and a tribute to Johnny Cash. In its second Covid-ravaged year, and for its 8th edition, in 2021 NHdocs screened over 120 films online and in-person, and once again included a student competition, online workshops, Q&As, a screening of the film "From the Left Hand" with a performance by its subject Norman Malone, and a tribute to feminist filmmaker Beth B with a live performance by Lydia Lunch.

In October 2023, after a ten-year run, NHdocs shuttered. The loss of available screening venues in the New Haven area was cited by Bechard as the main reason.

== Online Presence ==
Bechard launched a substack in April 2025, writing, "You can create a lot in 40 years." Subscribers get access to both previously published books (The Second Greatest Story Ever Told is available for everyone to read) and non-published works, short stories, old photos from Bechard's early filmmaking days, behind-the-scenes videos, scans of an old fanzine, some music from his band The Grubbies, and more.

== Pronounced Ah-Beetz ==
In 2025, Bechard, along with Jason Bischoff-Wurstle, Dean Falcone, and Colin M. Caplan, co-curated an exhibit at the New Haven Museum called Pronounced Ah-Beetz which celebrates the history of New Haven apizza. The exhibit, which opened on October 9, 2025, and will be on display until October 2027, features the history of New Haven's three iconic Pizza restaurants: Frank Pepe Pizzeria Napoletana, Sally's Apizza, and Modern Apizza, as well as other beloved pizza restaurants throughout the New Haven area.

Bechard began speaking with Bischoff-Wurstle in February 2020 about bringing a pizza exhibit to New Haven. The idea grew out of Bechard's documentary Pizza: A Love Story and his visiting the now-shuttered Pizza Museum in Chicago. He felt a pizza museum belonged in New Haven. It was made possible by the connections the filmmaker and his producing team of Falcone and Caplan had made with the families of local pizza restaurants during the making of the documentary. Numerous holy grails of pizza history are on display, including the oldest known pizza box from 1936, Frank Pepe's original baking hat, and pizza boxes signed by Yogi Berra and Gwyneth Paltrow.

== Awards ==
On November 12, 2015, Bechard was awarded the ASPCA Media Excellence Award for his work on the film A Dog Named Gucci and for "focusing on animal welfare and inspiring others to join the fight against animal cruelty."

== Personal life ==
Bechard has been married to Kristine M Covello since October 1992. They live in Connecticut with their two dogs, Dylan and Wilco (the Dog).

== Filmography ==
=== Films ===
- 1983: Disconnected
- 1987: Galactic Gigolo
- 1987: Psychos in Love
- 1989: Cemetery High
- 2002: The Kiss
- 2005: You Are Alone
- 2009: Friends (with benefits)
- 2011: Color Me Obsessed
- 2012: What Did You Expect?
- 2013: Broken Side of Time
- 2013: Every Everything: The Music, Life & Times of Grant Hart
- 2015: A Dog Named Gucci
- 2016: Who Is Lydia Loveless?
- 2017: Twenty Questions
- 2018: What it Takes: film en douze tableaux
- 2019: Pizza A Love Story
- 2020: Seniors A Dogumentary
- 2021: The Matchbox Man
- 2021: Where are you, Jay Bennett?
- 2022: Old Friends, A Dogumentary
- 2024: Slice of America: Charred in the Florida Sun (episode 1)

== Short films and music videos ==
In addition to his feature work, Bechard has made a number of short films and music videos.

- 1982: Bartholemew, the Strangler
- 1985: The Only Take
- 2000: The Pretty Girl
- 2001: M Flight 89
- 2003: Objects in the Mirror are Further than they Appear
- 2003: In Her Eyes
- 2004: This Used To Be My Beautiful Home
- 2005: Black Dogs Can't Jump
- 2005: Cars & History
- 2012: All Hail the Kings of Trash
- 2014: Broken Side of Time
- 2014: Boxers
- 2016: Heal Me
- 2016: Longer
- 2016: Clumps
- 2016: European
- 2017: (I Just Died) Like an Aviator
- 2017: Nothin' Feels Right But Doin' Wrong
- 2018: The Bottle Never Lets Me Down
- 2018: Aviator (unadorned)

== Works and publications ==
- Bechard, Gorman. The Second Greatest Story Ever Told: A Novel. New York, N.Y.: Carol Pub. Group, 1991. ISBN 978-0-806-51263-1
- Bechard, Gorman. Balls. New York, N.Y., U.S.A.: Plume, 1995. ISBN 978-0-452-27294-1
- Bechard, Gorman. Good Neighbors. New York: Carrol & Graf Publishers, 1998. ISBN 978-0-786-70512-2
- Bechard, Gorman. Ninth Square. New York: Forge, 2002. ISBN 978-0-765-30146-8
- writing as Baine, Jonathan. Unwound. New York : Onyx, 2007. ISBN 9780451412317
- Bechard, Gorman.], Hazmat Diary. CreateSpace Independent Publishing Platform, 2010. ISBN 978-1453690550
- Bechard, Gorman, Let it Be, published on substack, April 2025
- Bechard, Gorman, Snow Blind, published on substack, July 2025
