= A Dog Named Gucci =

- Poster
- Directed by: Gorman Bechard
- Produced by: Gorman Bechard; Kristine Bechard
- Cinematography: Gorman Bechard; Sarah Hajtol
- Edited by: Gorman Bechard
- Music by: Dean Falcone
- Production company: What Were We Thinking Films
- Distributed by: MVD Entertainment
- Release date: February 14, 2015 (Big Sky Documentary Film Festival)
- Running time: 84 minutes
- Country: United States
- Language: English

A Dog Named Gucci is a 2015 documentary film by Gorman Bechard that chronicles the story of an Alabama puppy set on fire, and the man who came to his rescue. The film made its American festival debut in February 2015 at the Big Sky Documentary Film Festival.

== Synopsis ==
Spring Hill College Professor Doug James rescues an abused puppy and sets out on a mission to change the laws in Alabama on domestic animal abuse. Teaming with local legislators, it took James six years to see the "Gucci Bill" finally passed into law.

Three other canine abuse cases feature: a rottweiler who was boarded in a kennel but starved to death, and two dogs who were burn victims, one of which was the first to test the new Gucci's Law.

In Care2, Alicia Graef described the film, "It began back in 1994, when a 10-week-old puppy named Gucci was hung from a tree, beaten, doused in lighter fluid and set on fire by a group of men in Mobile, Alabama. College professor Doug James was nearby by pure chance and rushed to help. He would later become Gucci’s second owner and together the two would eventually bring about a historic change in Alabama’s animal cruelty laws through legislation honoring Gucci."

== Release ==
Film screenings include the following:

- Missoula, Montana - Big Sky Documentary Film Festival, February 14, 2015
- Phoenix, Arizona - Phoenix Film Festival, March 27, 2015
- New Haven, Connecticut - New Haven Documentary Film Festival, June 7, 2015
- Birmingham, Alabama - Sidewalk Moving Picture Festival, August 30, 2015
- Mobile, Alabama - Crescent Theater, September 22, 2015
- Bay City, Michigan - Hell's Half Mile Film and Music Festival, September 27, 2015
- DVD release from MVD entertainment, April 19, 2016
- The film is available on digital streaming platforms iTunes, Amazon Prime, Google Play, and via pay-per-view on DirecTV.

== Awards ==
On November 12, 2015, director Gorman Bechard was awarded the ASPCA Media Excellence Award for his work on A Dog Named Gucci.

== Music ==
The end credits song from the film, "One Voice" written by Ruth Moody, features the talents of Norah Jones, Aimee Mann, Susanna Hoffs, Lydia Loveless, Neko Case, Kathryn Calder, and Brian May. It was produced by Dean Falcone, who also wrote the film's score. One Voice was released on Record Store Day, April 16, 2016, with profits from the sale of the single going to benefit animal charities.

== Critical response ==
Writing on The Movie Guys website, Ray Schillaci said, "Where many could have focused on the cruelty and the perpetrator, Bechard chooses to highlight the fight against such viciousness, the happiness and companionship that blossoms, and the bureaucratic struggles to achieve what is right. It’s a wonderful and beautiful testament to Gucci, his owner, and all other animals and the people that care for them."

Joey Kennedy, in the Animal Advocates of Alabama website, said, "Perhaps what is so remarkable about the film is how well Bechard is able to convey Gucci's charming personality. Bechard never met the dog, yet viewers left the theater feeling as if they had known Gucci personally. It would have been easy for Bechard to slip into over-sentimentality, but he doesn't. The story itself, especially as told mostly by James, is powerful enough without gimmicks."

Ralph Tribbey, in the DVD & Blu-Ray Release Report, called it "a heartfelt tale of love, kindness and a story of a man and his dog ... a man and his dog on a very special mission."

Jonathan Tressler, in the News-Herald, called it, "shocking, yet inspirational."

Amos Lassen called the film, "a positive and uplifting look at one victim who went on to become a hero. The story is one of triumph."

Writing in Diversity Rules Magazine, Jim Koury called it, "timely and poignant".
