= Todd May (disambiguation) =

Todd May may refer to:

- Todd May (philosopher) (born 1955), American philosopher
- Todd May (guitarist) (born 1965), American guitarist
