= Broken Side of Time (film) =

- poster
- Directed by: Gorman Bechard
- Produced by: Gorman Bechard; Lynn Mancinelli
- Starring: Lynn Mancinelli; Audria Ayers; Olivia Whelan; Jessica Mazo
- Cinematography: Gorman Bechard
- Edited by: Gorman Bechard
- Music by: Dean Falcone
- Production company: What Were We Thinking Films
- Release date: June 28, 2013 (Visionfest)
- Running time: 126 minutes
- Country: United States
- Language: English

Broken Side of Time is a drama by Gorman Bechard, part two of his Alone Trilogy that began with his 2005 feature, "You Are Alone." It made its film festival debut in June 2013.

The film was released on DVD on May 20, 2014 by MVD Entertainment. It is also streaming on Hulu and Amazon.com.

== Release ==
Film screenings included the following:

- New York, New York - VisionFest, June 28, 2013
- Bay City, MI - Hell's Half Mile Film & Music Festival, June 28, 2013
- Northampton, MA - Northampton International Film Festival, October 12, 2013
- Cleveland, Ohio - Ohio Independent Film Festival, November 9, 2013
- New York, New York - CineKink Festival, March 1, 2014

== Awards ==
- New York, New York - The Abe Schrager Award for Cinematography: Gorman Bechard, VisionFest, June 28, 2013
- Bay City, MI - Best Lead Actress: Lynn Mancinelli, Hell's Half Mile Film & Music Festival, June 28, 2013
- New York, New York - Audience Choice for Best Narrative Feature, CineKink, March 2, 2014
