= Lydia Loveless =

American musician (born 1990)

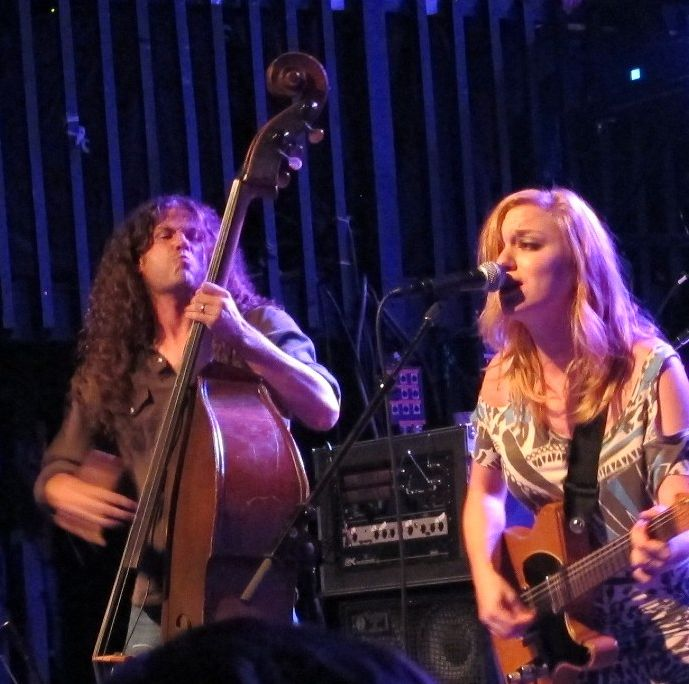
- Lydia Loveless (right) with bassist Ben Lamb (left) playing in Fort Collins, Colorado (2011)

Background information
- Born: Lydia Ruth Ankrom; September 4, 1990 (age 36); Coshocton, Ohio
- Origin: Columbus, Ohio
- Genres: Pop; country; honky-tonk; alternative country; punk rock
- Occupation: Singer-songwriter
- Instruments: Vocals, guitar
- Years active: 2008–present
- Labels: Bloodshot, Peloton
- Website: lydialoveless.com

Lydia Loveless (née Ankrom, born September 4, 1990) is an American alternative country singer-songwriter from Columbus, Ohio. Their (Note: Loveless uses they and she pronouns. This article uses they for consistency.) music combines pop music, classic country, honky tonk, and punk rock.

== Early life ==
Loveless was born in Coshocton, Ohio, in the Newcastle area. They are the daughter of Parker Chandler and have two older sisters: Eleanor Sinacola, and Jessica, who now performs under the stage name "Jessica Wabbit". Loveless grew up on a farm in a rural area outside of Coshocton and was home-schooled. They said they felt like an outcast in a town that emphasized religion and conformity until they moved to Columbus, Ohio, when they were 14. They enjoyed Hank Williams III and punk-influenced country music, while also embracing popular music and rock and roll and "pretty much anything on Kemado Records."

Their family is musical: Loveless's father was a pastor, drummer, and later country-western bar owner for a time. They and their sisters played several instruments. Loveless took piano lessons, then began trying to play the guitar at 12.

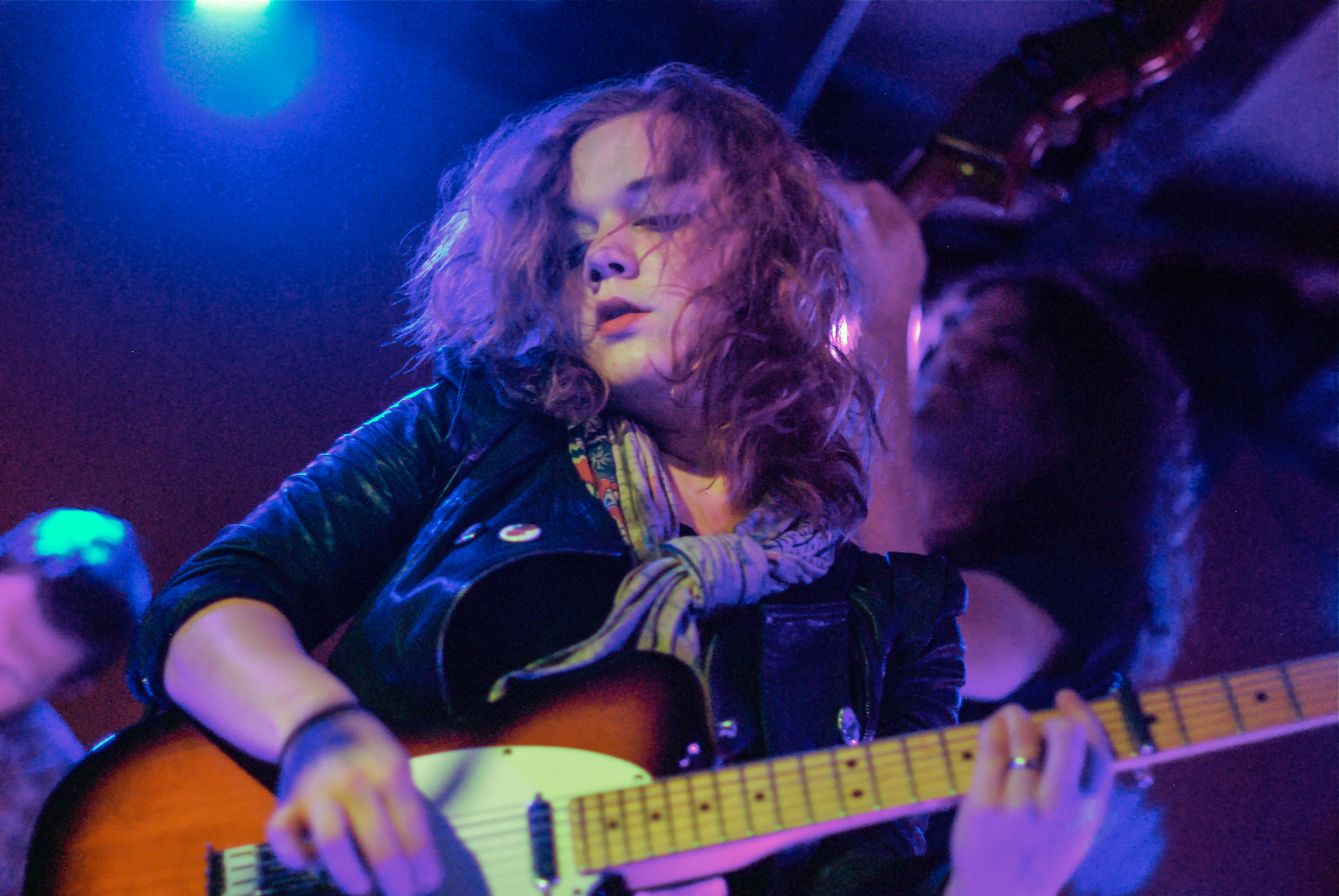
Loveless at DC9 (Washington DC) September 2014

== Career ==
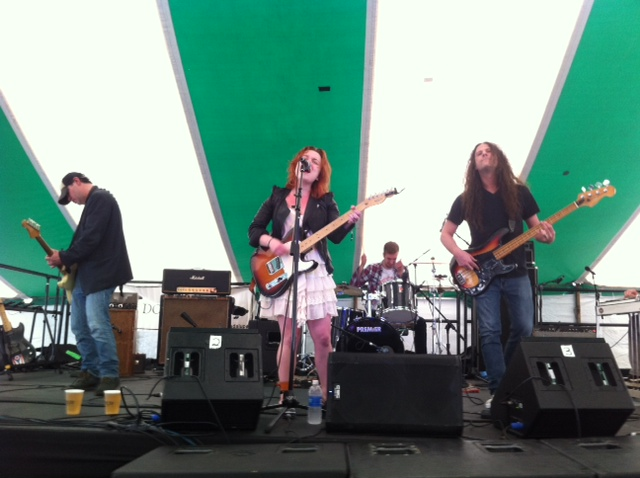
Lydia Loveless performing at SXSW 2014

In 2004, Loveless, their father, and their sisters made up part of a four-member new wave pop band called Carson Drew, named after the father in the Nancy Drew books. Loveless played bass. The band broke up in 2007.

At a show in Cincinnati where they opened for his band, Loveless met producer David Rhodes Brown (500 Miles to Memphis) who went on to produce their first album, 2010's The Only Man. Loveless was not happy with the slick production of the album. Loveless made the record when they were 15 years old. Loveless clarified that they like the songs they wrote, but the drawn-out process (over three years) to get the album released influenced their feelings about the project.

Columbus attorney Steve McGann became their manager. Loveless and their band drove 20 hours to Austin, Texas, and ended up playing for Bloodshot owners Rob Miller and Nan Warshaw at the 2010 South by Southwest music festival.

In 2012, signed with Bloodshot and determined to make a more raw and edgier album, they released Indestructible Machine with songs that feature themes of frustration with their hometown, drinking, depression, and a humorous song about being stalked by a man who referred to himself as Steve Earle but was not in fact the singer of "Copperhead Road". Loveless recorded the album with many live takes and a minimum of overdubs at Grove City, Ohio's Sonic Lounge recording studio with engineer Joe Viers. Spin characterized the record as standing out "for its utter lack of bullshit", with "roaring vocals, in her narrators' lived-in-bars recklessness, and in her overall inability to mince words."

Indestructible Machine received praise from AllMusic and in publications such as the Chicago Tribune, Spin, and The Washington Post. Greg Kot wrote that Loveless's "defiant tone is matched by songs that put country and punk on equal ground, unvarnished and direct".

In the Spring of 2013, Loveless did an extensive Canadian tour supporting the Supersuckers. Loveless and their band also toured Scandinavia and Spain during the fall of 2013.

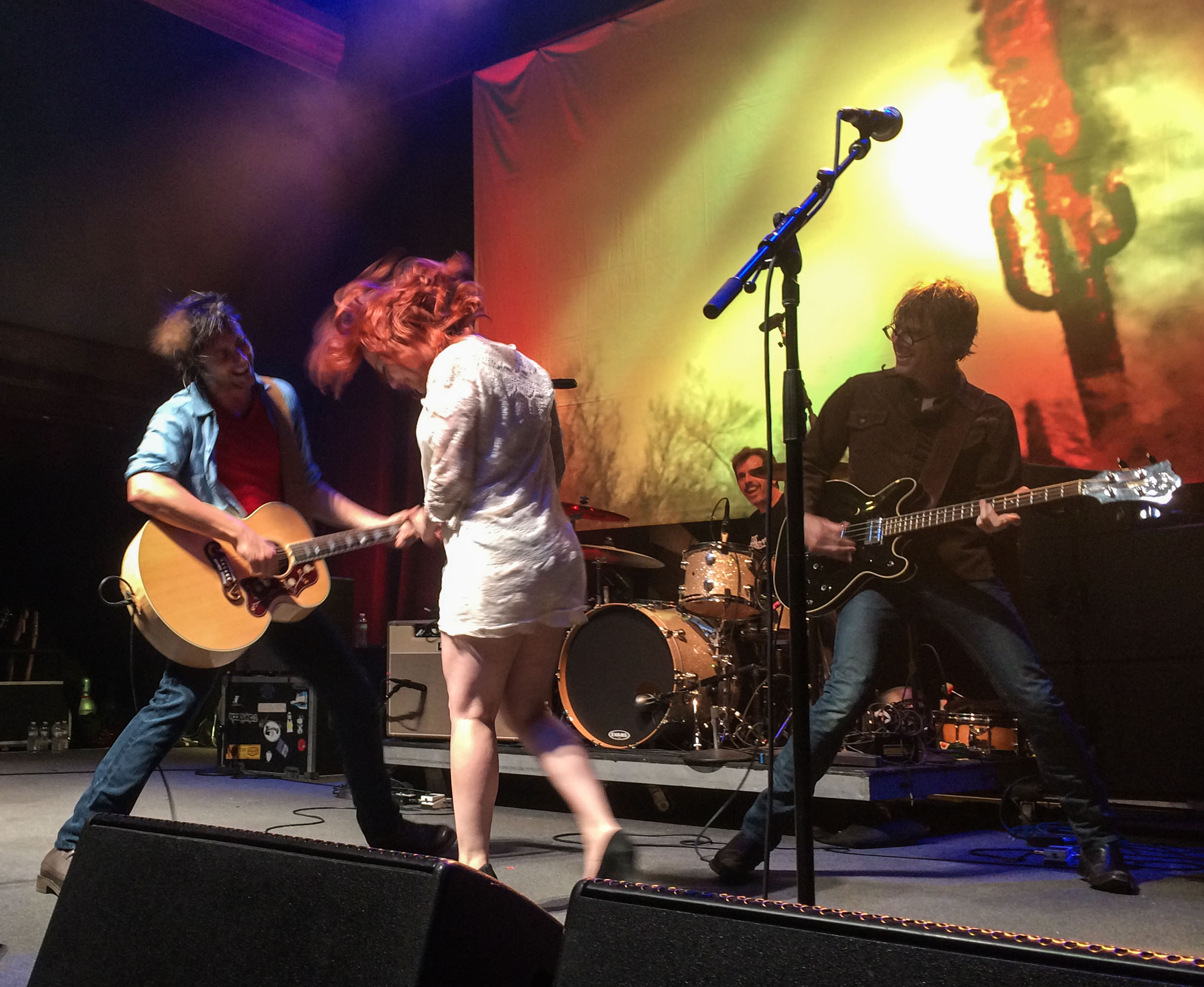
Lydia Loveless singing Four Leaf Clover with the Old 97s. 9:30 Club (Washington DC) May 31, 2014

In 2013, Loveless released Boy Crazy, an EP. Mark Deming of AllMusic praised the release, asserting that the album "is further proof that Loveless is a major talent, and if her next album is as good as this, she may run the risk of becoming a very big star". One of the songs, "Lover's Spat", is about the serial killer Jeffrey Dahmer.

Rolling Stone cited Loveless as one of its "10 New Artists You Need to Know: January 2014".

In February 2014, Loveless released their third full-length record, Somewhere Else, on Bloodshot Records, which has a dark, "poppy" vibe. Stereogum said Loveless is using their "unmistakable voice as a songwriter, and she's only getting better at using it to blur the line between running her mouth and pouring out her heart." Loveless was listed as one of "5 Best New Artist for January 14" by Spin magazine. The record includes "Head", a single Loveless wrote with their guitar player, Todd May, a fellow songwriter. The album had a very positive reception and entered Billboard's Heatseekers chart (new entries to Billboard charts, compiled by Nielsen SoundScan) the first week of its release at position number 7.

In April 2014, Loveless released the Mile High/Blind 7" record for Record Store Day. The record had a non-album cut titled "Mile High" on the A side and a cover of Kesha's "Blind" on the B side. It was a limited edition release on lime green vinyl. The tracks were released in digital album format on May 27, 2014.

In April 2015, Loveless was part of a Record Store Day release with label-mate, Cory Branan. The two artists cover two Prince songs: Loveless doing "I Would Die 4 U" and Branan doing "Under the Cherry Moon". The 7" limited edition releases were also pressed onto purple vinyl.

Loveless donated their vocal talent to the end credits song from the film, A Dog Named Gucci, in the song "One Voice", which also features the voices of Norah Jones, Aimee Mann, Susanna Hoffs, Neko Case, Brian May and Kathryn Calder. It was produced by Dean Falcone, who also wrote the film's score. "One Voice" was released on Record Store Day, April 16, 2016, with profits from the sale of the single going to benefit animal charities.

In August 2016, Bloodshot Records released their third studio album, Real. Their first ever music video, for the album's first single "Longer" received its world premiere through Rolling Stone in July 2016. The video was directed by filmmaker Gorman Bechard, who directed the documentary on Loveless. On August 19, a second Bechard-directed music video was released this time for the song "Clumps". The next morning Loveless and their band made their American TV network debut, performing three songs on CBS Saturday Morning. A video for the song "European", also directed by Bechard, debuted in November 2016.

The A.V. Club called Real "an adventurous, brutal honest sucker punch", while The Boston Globe said, "Loveless continues to manifest a remarkable combination of bruised vulnerability and desperate longing, alongside a tough, self-deprecating resilience, but there's more of the former and less of the latter this time. She's still preoccupied with the downsides of love: longing for something you don't (or can't) have, the inevitable dissolution of whatever you manage to find (and the difficulty of finding it in the first place), and the emotional pitfalls of navigating it." Rolling Stone liked the shift in genre towards a more pop sound.

Loveless released their fourth studio album Daughter through their own label, Honey, You're Gonna Be Late Records on September 25, 2020.

== Documentary ==
Loveless was the subject of a documentary called Who Is Lydia Loveless?, in which filmmaker Gorman Bechard (Color Me Obsessed, Every Everything: The Music, Life & Times of Grant Hart) documented the making of Loveless's album Real, as well as following their on the road, and looking into what life is like for a band at their level in the music industry. "I also wanted to look at stuff we normally don't see a lot of. What are the finances for a band like this? Where does the money go? Who gets the money? Is Spotify good? Is Spotify bad? How does piracy affect you? What about the fans? I really wanted to go into all of that for a band that can still sell out 200–250 seat venues and bars but is still all travelling in an old Ford van. A good night is when they have a couple of hotel rooms. No one is rolling in the dough so to speak. So what is it at that point when you have amazing critical success and acclaim but you're not there yet?" In October 2015, Bechard and his crew filmed a live Lydia Loveless concert at Skully's in their hometown of Columbus for the documentary. The film had its world premiere on April 7, 2016 at the Columbus International Film & Video Festival.

== Songwriting ==
Loveless characterizes their songwriting as "singing about emotions". Loveless is an avowed fan of Kesha, and has played "Blind" in their live shows, as well as in a recording featured on their Boy Crazy and Single(s) release.

== Discography ==
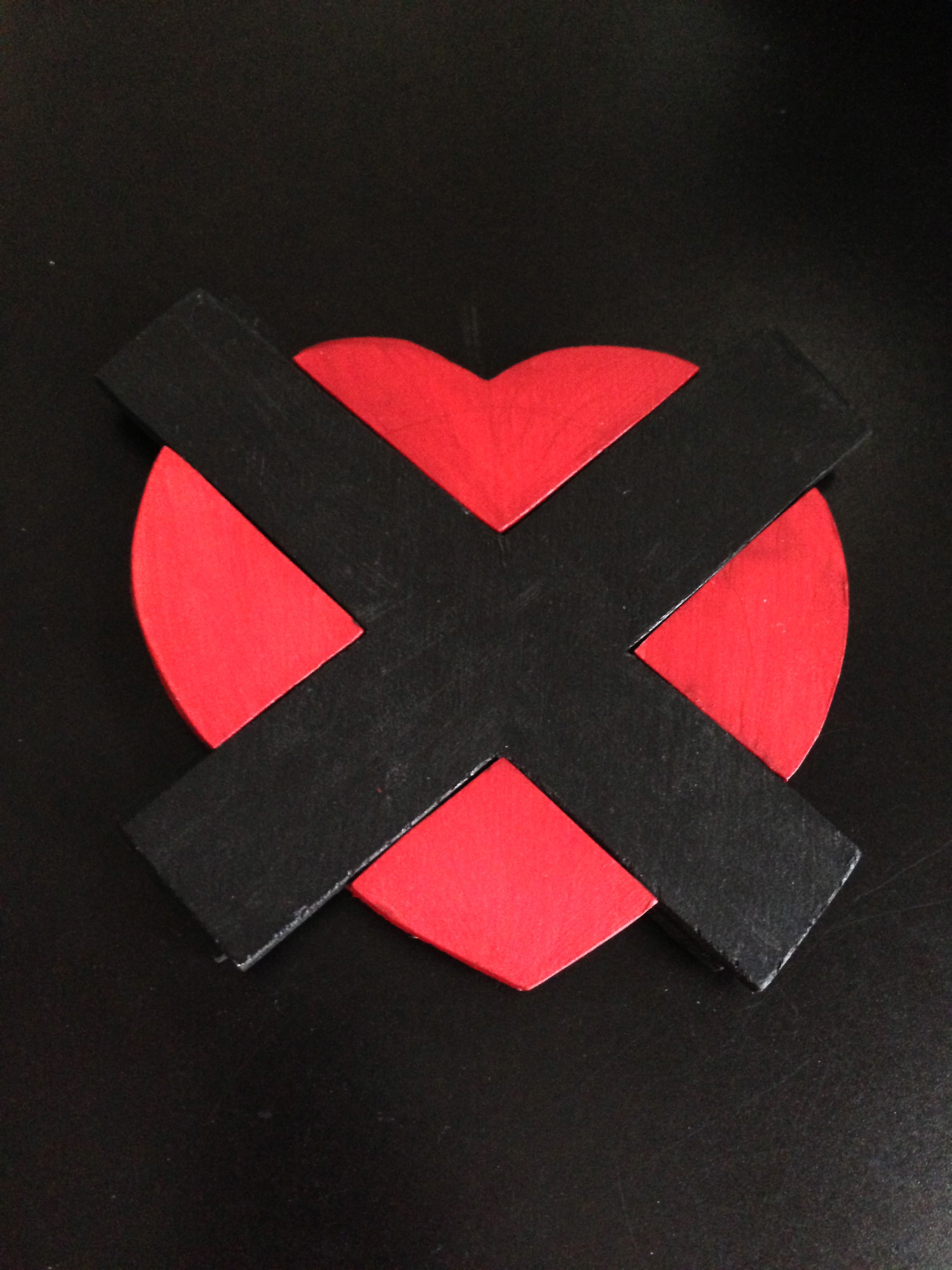
Hand-made wood coaster in shape of Lydia Loveless's heart tattoo – with an X through it. Made by Ben Lamb, their ex-husband.

=== Albums and EPs ===
Lydia Loveless albums and EPs
Year	Title	Label
2010	The Only Man	Peloton
2011	Indestructible Machine	Bloodshot
2013	Boy Crazy	Bloodshot
2014	Somewhere Else	Bloodshot
2016	Real	Bloodshot
2017	Boy Crazy and Single(s)	Bloodshot
2020	Daughter	Honey, You're Gonna Be Late
2023	Nothing's Gonna Stand in My Way Again	Bloodshot
2024	Something Else	Bloodshot
2026	Accolades	Bloodshot

=== Singles ===
Lydia Loveless singles
Year	Title	Label
2011	"Bad Way to Go" / "Alison"	Bloodshot
2014	"Mile High" / "Blind"	Bloodshot
2015	"I Would Die 4 U"	Bloodshot

=== Live performances ===
In addition to touring extensively Loveless has performed at many in-studio radio shows, including Daytrotter, KEXP-FM, and NPR.

Year	Title	Label
2016	Lydia Loveless – and Audio Live session	Audiotree
2017	Lydia Loveless Folkadelphia Session April 11, 2017	Folkadelphia

=== Music videos ===
- 2016: "Longer"
- 2016: "Clumps"
- 2016: "European"
- 2017: "Same to You"
- 2023: "Toothache"

== Personal life ==
Loveless was married to their bassist, Ben Lamb, who is also a graphic artist. They resided in Columbus, Ohio; after they divorced, Loveless moved to Raleigh, North Carolina.

Loveless's older sisters, Jessica Wabbit and Eleanor Sinacola, also have their own bands (The Girls! and Dead Girlfriend, respectively). Loveless's younger brother, Nate, is the drummer of Shores of Elysium, a death metal/deathcore band from Columbus, Ohio.

Loveless is gender-fluid and uses they/she pronouns.
