= Daughter (album) =

Studio album by Lydia Loveless
- Released: September 25, 2020
- Recorded: 2019
- Studios: The Loft, Chicago, Illinois, United States
- Genre: Country
- Length: 42:17
- Language: English
- Labels: Honey, You're Gonna Be Late
- Producers: Lydia Loveless; Tom Schick

Lydia Loveless chronology
Boy Crazy and Single(s) (2017)	Daughter (2020)	Nothing's Gonna Stand in My Way Again (2023)

Daughter is a studio album from American country musician Lydia Loveless released on September 25, 2020. This is the first release on Loveless' own Honey, You're Gonna Be Late Records and has received positive reviews from critics.

== Recording and release ==
Loveless revealed that she had recorded new music in March 2020, including a new emphasis on piano and performing the bass parts in the music. The title was announced on July 21 with the advance single "Love Is Not Enough"; Loveless decided to release the work via a vanity label after leaving Bloodshot Records.

== Reception ==
Professional ratings
Review scores
Source	Rating
Tom Hull – on the Web	B+

Album of the Year sums up critical consensus as a 78 out of 100, based on two reviews. Ethan Gordon of No Ripcord gave Daughter eight out of 10, praising her for musical experimentation but noting that the album's "strength comes when Loveless writes disarmingly mid-tempo songs" and in particular, "stirring and warm instrumentation with sad and/or rough lyrics paired side by side". Associated Press' Pablo Gorondi gave a favorable review for the album incorporating classic sounds from Loveless' previous work as well as new instrumentation and a focus on introspective lyrics. Paste included this in their five best rock albums of September 2020, with reviewer Eric R. Danton praising it for "brutally candid" songwriting and Loveless' "massive, powerful voice".

== Track listing ==
All songs written by Lydia Loveless

1. "Dead Writer" – 4:16
2. "Love Is Not Enough" – 3:20
3. "Wringer" – 3:23
4. "Can’t Think" – 4:40
5. "Say My Name" – 4:32
6. "Never" – 4:17
7. "Daughter" – 4:59
8. "When You’re Gone" – 2:57
9. "September" – 4:51
10. "Don’t Bother Mountain" – 5:02

== Personnel ==
- Lydia Loveless – vocals; guitar on "Dead Writer", "Love Is Not Enough", "Wringer", "Can’t Think", "Say My Name", "Daughter", "When You’re Gone", and "Don’t Bother Mountain"; piano on "Love Is Not Enough", "Never", "Daughter", and "September"; bass guitar on "Dead Writer", "Can't Think", "Say My Name", and "When You're Gone"; synthesizer on "Wringer"; piano on "Love Is Not Enough", "Never", "Daughter", and "September"; drum machine on "Don't Bother Mountain"; Wurlitzer electric piano on "Daughter"; arrangement; production
- Nora Barton – cello on "September"
- Jay Gasper – guitar on all tracks except "September", bass guitar on "Love Is Not Enough" and "Wringer", piano on "Dead Writer"; pedal steel guitar on "Dead Writer" and "Wringer"; arrangement
- Laura Jane Grace – backing vocals on "September"
- George Hondroulis – drums and percussion on all except "September"; arrangement
- Todd May – guitar on "Dead Writer", "Can’t Think", "Say My Name", "Never", "Daughter", "When You’re Gone", and "Don’t Bother Mountain"; acoustic guitar on "Love Is Not Enough" and "Wringer"; bass guitar on "Never", "Daughter", and "Don't Bother Mountain"; synthesizer on "Never" and "Don't Bother Mountain"; organ on "Say My Name"; electric guitar on "Love Is Not Enough", optigan on "Don't Bother Mountain"; Wurlitzer electric piano on "Don't Bother Mountain"; backing vocals on "Love Is Not Enough", "Say My Name", "Never", "Daughter", and "Don't Bother Mountain"; arrangement
- Tom Schick – engineering, mixing, production
- Shelly Steffens – mastering at Chicago Mastering Service, Chicago, Illinois, United States
- Megan Toenyes – photography, design

== See also ==
- List of 2020 albums
