= Friends (With Benefits) =

2009 independent film by Gorman Bechard

- Official poster
- Directed by: Gorman Bechard
- Written by: Gorman Bechard; Ashley McGarry
- Produced by: Gorman Bechard; Ashley McGarry
- Starring: Margaret Laney; Alex Brown; Anne Petersen; Jake Alexander; Lynn Mancinelli; Brendan Bradley; Rooney Mara
- Cinematography: Adrian Correia
- Music by: Dean Falcone; Stephen Harris
- Distributed by: What We Were Thinking Films Inc.
- Release date: June 12, 2009
- Running time: 94 minutes
- Country: United States
- Language: English

Friends (with benefits) is a 2009 romantic comedy film released on June 12, 2009 at the Seattle True Independent Film Festival.

== Production ==
=== Casting ===
The film stars Margaret Laney as Chloe and Alex Brown as Owen, lifelong best friends and current med school students. Rounding out their tight-knit group of friends are Anne Peterson as Allison, Jake Alexander as Jeff, Lynn Mancinelli as Shirley, Brendan Bradley as Brad and Rooney Mara as Tara.

=== Development ===
Taken off a script originally written by Gorman Bechard in 1999, the film was shopped around that summer under the title Fuck Buddies to every major studio in Hollywood. Inevitably, the script was put on the back burner until Bechard started looking for a lighter follow-up to his extremely dark 2005 feature You Are Alone. In 2006 Bechard teamed with writing partner Ashley McGarry and they began to rewrite the film, changing the title to Friends (with benefits) and casting Margaret Laney in the lead role.

=== Filming ===
Production began in April 2007. The film was shot over 18 days in New Haven, Connecticut.

== Release ==
The film debuted at the Seattle True Independent Film Festival on June 12, 2009 and received the award for "Best Romantic Comedy". The film was released on DVD in the United States in August 2010.

| Location | Award |
|---|---|
| Seattle True Independent Film Festival | "Best Romantic Comedy" |
| Sacramento Film and Music Festival | "Best Narrative Feature" |
| Royal Flush Festival | "Best Narrative Feature" |
| Hell's Half Mile Film & Music Festival | Festival's Best |
| First Glance Philadelphia | "Best Ensemble Cast" |
