= Psychos in Love =

- Film poster
- Directed by: Gorman Bechard
- Written by: Gorman Bechard; Carmine Capobianco
- Produced by: Gorman Bechard
- Starring: Carmine Capobianco; Debi Thibeault; Frank Stewart
- Cinematography: Gorman Bechard
- Edited by: Gorman Bechard
- Music by: Carmine Capobianco
- Production company: Generic Films
- Distributed by: Empire Pictures
- Release date: July 24, 1987 (New York City)
- Running time: 88 minutes
- Country: United States
- Language: English
- Budget: $75,000

Psychos in Love is a 1987 American black comedy slasher film directed by Gorman Bechard and starring Carmine Capobianco and Debi Thiebeault. Its plot follows a bartender, Joe, and Kate, a manicurist, who begin dating only to discover that they are both longtime serial killers. The film has developed a cult following in the years since its release.

== Plot ==
Joe, a bartender and strip club proprietor, and Kate, a manicurist, meet after trying to find a significant other for a long time. They are both murderers, a fact the two bond over after revealing their crimes to each other. They also bond over their mutual hatred of grapes. Kate has exclusively killed men, while Joe targets women. Before meeting Kate, Joe murdered many women after bringing them to his home.

During a house visit to a male mechanic, Kate is attacked and sexually assaulted, but stabs the man with a nail file before clobbering him to death with a rock. Later, Susan, a topless dancer, auditions for a job at the bar in Joe and Kate's home, only for Joe to stab her to death before decapitating her and using her head as a decorative centerpiece in the kitchen.

As the couple's relationship progresses, Kate suggests that she and Joe commit a murder together. Joe brings home Nikki, a dancer from the bar who is attracted to Kate. Once there, Joe stabs Nikki several times, but she does not die. As Nikki attempts to attack, Joe proceeds to clobber her with a frying pan. When she revives again, Joe shoots her with a shotgun. Kate suggests that the two stop killing, as she is bored by it and oney interested in her romance with Joe. The two decide they will be married before dismembering Nikki.

Joe and Kate have a wedding, and honeymoon in Chicago, where they meet a female prostitute at an oldies bar. Having never murdered a prostitute, Joe is excited about fulfilling his "Jack the Ripper" fantasy, and stabs the woman to death in the shower. Following their honeymoon, both Joe and Kate begin indulging in their murderous urges again. The couple's marriage begins to falter when Kate becomes jealous of Joe's encounters with women. Kate contemplates that she no longer finds murder enjoyable. The couple decide to buy a VCR, hoping to find voyeuristic enjoyment out of watching slasher films. The two rent numerous videos, including the entire Friday the 13th and Halloween series.

After finding their kitchen sink is clogged with entrails of their victims, Joe and Kate summon a neighborhood plumber, Herman, who is in fact a cannibal. Finding severed fingers in the drain, Herman tries to blackmail the couple, hoping they will supply him with corpses, and threatens to kill them and cook their bodies with a grape sauce if they refuse. Joe turns out the lights to divert Herman's attention, and manages to brutally kill Herman.

Following Herman's murder, Joe and Kate decide to go out for dinner, but bicker over which type of cuisine they want and continue to proclaim their hatred of grapes.

== Cast ==
- Carmine Copabianco as Joe
- Debi Thiebeault as Kate
- Frank Stewart as Herman
- Angela Nicholas as Dianne
- Eric Lutes as Mechanic
- Ruth Collins as Susan
- Cecelia Wilde as Nikki
- Jerry Rakow as Henry
- Irma St. Paule as Sara

== Production ==
Carmine Capobianco said of the script, "We decided to do something that was totally off the wall, totally fun". The part of Herman the Plumber was played by Frank Stewart, for whom the role had been especially written. Many of the scenes were improvised and the music was played on a Casio CZ synthesizer. Filming took place in Connecticut in Hartford, New Haven, and Waterbury.

== Release ==
Psychos in Love screened at the Bleecker Street Cinema beginning the weekend of July 24, 1987, receiving coverage from news outlets.

=== Home media ===
Psychos in Love was released on VHS in 1987 by Wizard Video. The film was released on DVD by Shriek Show, a division of Media Blasters, in 2009. The special features include commentaries, a behind the scenes look at the film's production, multiple beginning credits, longer scenes, the film's trailer, a picture gallery, and parts of the stage production.

On September 26, 2017, the film was released on DVD and Blu-ray by Vinegar Syndrome.

The trailer for the film appeared on the 2020 compilation mixtape The AGFA Horror Trailer Show.

== Reception ==
A TV Guide review said, "Sophomoric, gross, warped, and more than a bit depraved, Psychos in Love succeeds as a low-budget satire of American dating rituals, modern relationships, suburbia, and slasher movies. Although at times the pacing is sluggish and only about half the jokes are funny, it does have a zany originality. Narrated by both Joe and Kate, the film is often self-reflexive as the viewer is reminded throughout that it's all 'just a movie' as actors make asides to the camera, or put their hands over the lens, or slap away the mike-boom when it comes into frame. While certainly not for the squeamish, Psychos in Love does have a certain grotesque charm and may achieve a minor sort of cult status among fans of the bizarre."

Bill Gibron of DVD Talk wrote, "This critic didn't like this movie when he first saw it back in the late '80s, and nothing has changed since then. He didn't find it funny, inventive, or scary".

== Related works ==
A play adapted from the film was released in 2003 at the Broom Street Theater.

== Sources ==
- Albright, Brian (2012). Regional Horror Films, 1958-1990: A State-by-State Guide with Interviews. Jefferson, North Carolina: McFarland & Company. ISBN 978-0-786-47227-7.
- Watt, Mike (2013). Fervid Filmmaking: 66 Cult Pictures of Vision, Verve and No Self-Restraint. Jefferson, North Carolina: McFarland & Company. ISBN 978-0-786-49335-7.
