= The Kiss (2003 film) =

- Release poster
- Directed by: Gorman Bechard
- Written by: Gorman Bechard; Stephen Manzi
- Produced by: Arthur Chang
- Starring: Terence Stamp; Francoise Surel; Eliza Dushku; Billy Zane; Illeana Douglas
- Cinematography: Chris Squires
- Edited by: Lori Ball
- Music by: Ruy Folguera
- Production company: Kingman Films
- Distributed by: Artist View Entertainment
- Release date: 2003
- Running time: 90 minutes
- Country: United States
- Language: English

The Kiss is a 2003 direct-to-video film starring Francoise Surel, Eliza Dushku, Terence Stamp, and Billy Zane.

== Plot ==
Cara Thompson is a book editor who is entranced by a certain old manuscript about a romance. Unfortunately, she discovers that the story is unfinished, so with her roommate Megan, she attempts to find the author, only to be disappointed that he is nothing more than a broken man after his wife's death. The editor forms a close friendship with him, and they find the meaning of true love.

== Cast ==
- Francoise Surel as Cara Thompson
- Eliza Dushku as Megan
- Terence Stamp as Philip Naudet
- Billy Zane as Alan Roberts
- Illeana Douglas as Joyce Rothman
- William Mapother as Peter
- Steven Gilborn as Mumford
