= Sarah Shook =

American country singer (born 1985)

River Shook
- Born: Sarah Marie Shook; 1985 (age 40–41); Rochester, New York, U.S.
- Origin: Chatham County, North Carolina U.S.
- Genres: Alternative country, indie rock
- Occupation: Singer-songwriter
- Instruments: Vocals, guitar
- Years active: 2005–present
- Labels: Bloodshot Records; Thirty Tigers; Kill Rock Stars
- Member of: Sarah Shook & The Disarmers; Mightmare
- Formerly of: Sarah Shook & The Devil; Sarah Shook & The Dirty Hands

River Shook (born September 15, 1985) is an American country singer-songwriter from Chatham County, North Carolina. Their "high lonesome" style incorporates country-punk, twang, and outlaw country.

== Early life ==
Shook was born in Rochester, New York. They were homeschooled and grew up in a fundamentalist Christian family where music was restricted; they were permitted only to listen to classical and worship music. When Shook was 9 years old they taught themself piano, and in high school they taught themself acoustic guitar.

The family moved often when Shook was young. In July 2005, when they were 19 years old, they and their family moved to Garner, North Carolina.

== Career ==
In 2010, Shook started their first band, Sarah Shook and the Devil. The band was made up of Shook on vocals and guitar, Jon Baughman on bass, Phil Sullivan on lap steel, and Eric Peterson on guitar. The band released a seven-song EP, 2013's Seven but disbanded later the same year.

In 2013, Shook formed the band Sarah Shook and the Dirty Hands, with Devil bandmate Eric Peterson. They played regionally, mostly in North Carolina, for around a year. Shook then started a new band called Sarah Shook & the Disarmers in mid to late 2014. The band started as a recording project, with Eric Peterson on guitar, and John Howie Jr. (Two Dollar Pistols, John Howie Jr. & the Rosewood Bluff) on drums, Jason Hendrick on bass fiddle, and Phil Sullivan on lap steel.

Sarah Shook and the Disarmers released their first full-length album Sidelong, on October 16, 2015, at the Cat's Cradle Back Room in Chapel Hill, NC, with a re-release in 2017. Sidelong was produced by Ian Schreier at Manifold Recording Studios, which is near the Haw River in North Carolina. The record was tracked and recorded live in April 2015. The band found regional and national success with the record. Shook signed with Kathie Russell of RedKats Artist Management, which led to their signing with Chicago's Bloodshot Records in January 2017.

The records was number 2 on Indy Week's top 25 best albums of 2015. Sarah Shook and the Disarmers were listed as one of 10 New Country Artists to Know in July 2016. Also in 2016, BuzzFeed Community listed Shook as one of five women country artists who are impacting music, and the album received positive reviews.

In April 2018, Sarah Shook & the Disarmers released their second record, titled Years, on Bloodshot Records. Shook and the band worked on the songs while touring heavily. Shook also focused on learning vocal techniques as a way to control and release their vocals, which led to what many reviews cited as a crisper vocal sound. Music critic Greg Kot compared their vocals to those of jazz vocals, noting that Shook and the band, who have toured together for years, are ferocious. The song "Good as Gold" was chosen as one of Rolling Stone's 10 best country and Americana songs of the week in March 2018. Years went on to receive multiple positive reviews. The Disarmers at the time was made up of Eric Peterson on guitar, Aaron Oliva on bass, Jack Foster on drums, and Adam "Ditch" Kurtz on pedal steel.

A documentary, What it Takes: film en douze tableaux by director Gorman Bechard, premiered at the Independent Film Festival Boston on 29 April 2018, and was released to DVD on November 9, 2018. The film follows Shook as they wrote and recorded Years. The music blog If It's Too Loud commented, "Film documentaries are typically put out by a record company as a way to cash in on an artist and are little more than fluff pieces, or they focus on drama within a band. What it Takes: film en douze tableaux doesn't do any of that. While Bechard is an obvious fan of his subject, he shows them as is, and doesn't try to show them glossed over or hyped up."

In December 2018, Years was included in the best-albums-of-2018 year-end lists of PopMatters (32nd) and Louder Than War (39th).

In November 2021, Shook announced a third album, Nightroamer, which was released on February 18, 2022 via Thirty Tigers (following the sale of Bloodshot Records, which had caused the album to be delayed). In addition to returning members Peterson, Oliva and original pedal steel player Phil Sullivan, Will Rigby joined the band on drums. There were also additional performances from organist Skip Edwards, with longtime Dwight Yoakam collaborator Pete Anderson producing the album.

In May 2022, Shook announced a new indie rock side project called Mightmare. They are joined in the band by Ash Lopez on bass, Blake Tallent on guitar, and Ethan Standard on drums. The band's debut album, Cruel Liars, was released on October 14, 2022, via Kill Rock Stars.

== Personal life ==
Shook has a son. Shook is non-binary and uses they/them pronouns.

Shook grew up in a deeply religious environment, but is now an atheist. Shook is bisexual, and is politically active in supporting LGBT and civil rights causes. Along with fellow musician and activist Erika Libero (Henbrain), they won the 2016 Indy Arts Award for their work with Chapel Hill-based Safe Space initiative, which was an effort to get local businesses to put up stickers that offered safe spaces for people needing it, and for their work putting on a two-day music festival, Manifest, which includes bands that have at least one female or non-binary member.

== Discography ==
with The Devil

- 2013: Seven EP (self-released)

with The Disarmers

- 2015: Sidelong (self-released, re-released on Bloodshot Records in 2017)
- 2018: Years (Bloodshot Records)
- 2022: Nightroamer (Thirty Tigers)
- 2024: Revelations (Thirty Tigers)

with Mightmare

- 2022: Cruel Liars (Kill Rock Stars)

River Shook

- 2026: River Shook (self-released)
