= Old Friends Senior Dog Sanctuary =

American nonprofit organization

Old Friends Senior Dogs, Inc.
- Founded: April 26, 2012; 14 years ago
- Tax ID no.: 45-5084188
- Legal status: 501(c)(3) Non-profit organization
- Purpose: "To provide a loving home, good food, high quality vet care, compassion and comfort to senior dogs for the remainder of their lives."
- Location: 765 Nonaville Road Mount Juliet, TN 37122 US
- Region served: Mount Juliet, Tennessee
- Leader: Zina and Michael Goodin
- Website: ofsds.org

Old Friends Senior Dog Sanctuary (OFSDS), officially Old Friends Senior Dogs, Inc., is a nonprofit animal rescue group in Mount Juliet, Tennessee. It focuses on the rescue of elderly, "senior" dogs from shelters where they are otherwise likely to be euthanized.

== History ==
OFSDS was founded by Zina and Michael Goodin in Mount Juliet, Tennessee. Both were mechanical engineers prior to operating the sanctuary. In 2011, they began rescuing Golden Retrievers through the Middle Tennessee Golden Retriever Rescue. The rescue asked the Goodins to adopt an elderly, 15-year-old dog who had been returned to a shelter from a foster family. The dog, Bandit, lived with the Goodins for less than a month before his death. Fostering Bandit was the Goodins' impetus for adopting elderly dogs. They expanded to other breeds, taking in shelter dogs that would otherwise be euthanized. Of the couple's decision to rescue senior dogs, Zina Goodin stated, "Senior dogs were the last to be adopted (if ever) and often ended up being bounced from one foster home to another because of their unique needs and problems, and people’s general unwillingness to bring in a new family member with potentially higher vet bills who may only live for a few months or years.” In 2012, they received official nonprofit status. At first, the Goodins operated the sanctuary out of their home, though they found that some neighbors were not supportive of living next to a dog sanctuary. Prior to 2017, the approximately 50 dogs in care of the sanctuary lived in two separate homes in a residential area. In August 2016, the county zoning board determined that the sanctuary must move due to neighbor complaints. In February 2017, the Goodins opened a dedicated space for the rescued dogs.

As of 2022, OFSDS has provided sanctuary to over 1,400 elderly and disabled dogs at its facilities.

== Operations ==
OFSDS seeks to improve the lives of senior dogs, which it defines as dogs who are age eight and older. Most of its dogs are at least ten years old, however. It adopts suitable dogs from five regional animal shelters. It includes a network of forever foster homes within 100 mi (160 km) of Mount Juliet, where dogs can be placed with families while still remaining under the ultimate ownership of the sanctuary. While in forever foster homes with Geezer Guardians (forever families), OFSDS continues to provide and cover the costs of all medical care (routine, specialty, and emergency) and preventive healthcare to alleviate some of the burden of adopting an older dog. The forever home provides food and love." Forever foster homes are not charged to forever foster a dog from the sanctuary. As of 2022, approximately 400 dogs are currently in forever homes supported by OFSDS and nearly 120 are looking for their own.

OFSDS is dependent on donations for operations. Maintaining the healthcare of elderly dogs is a major expense, with the organization averaging US$20,000 on veterinary bills each month. In addition to donations, they receive money from selling branded merchandise. Selling one such shirt featuring the dog Leo has raised over $93,000 for the organization.

== Facilities ==
From 2017 to 2021, OFSDS operated on a 2 acres (0.81 ha) property with a 7,200 ft^{2} (670 m^{2}) building known as Grandpaw's Gardens, which was formerly a florist business. The property included "a parklike environment with large trees, landscaping, and a greenhouse to convert to a rainy-day play area." As of June 12, 2021, OFSDS operates from The PAWvillions, a custom-built 20,000 sq ft facility situated on 9 acres, less than one mile from its previous location. The new location features a fully-functioning veterinary clinic, splash pad, walking trail, yards for every dog room, an indoor yard, and more. Visitors can sign up via the organization's website to tour the facility.

== Following ==
OFSDS has amassed a large social media following, with 1.7 million followers on their Facebook page as of June 2022. Individual dogs within the sanctuary may become particularly beloved by followers. The death of Captain Ron in March 2018 was covered in the Irish Examiner and the death of Leo in 2018 was covered in New York Magazine, for example.

== Documentary ==
OFSDS and its founders were also featured in the documentary film Seniors A Dogumentary from director Gorman Bechard. The film premiered in March 2020 at the Belcourt Theatre in Nashville, and was released on DVD and pay-per-view in September 2020. Sharon Knolle in MoviePaws called it "a heartwarming celebration of these sweet animals and the people who make sure their last years are spent with a lot of love and comfort." A follow-up documentary entitled Old Friends: A Dogumentary, The Paw-Inspiring Tale of Old Friends Senior Dog Sanctuary from the same director premiered in April 2022 and focuses entirely on the organization's history and mission. Commercial release of this second film is TBD.
