= Somewhere Else (Lydia Loveless album) =

Studio album by Lydia Loveless
- Released: February 18, 2014
- Studio: Sonic Lounge (Columbus, Ohio)
- Length: 42:16
- Label: Bloodshot
- Producers: Lydia Loveless; Joe Viers

Lydia Loveless chronology
Boy Crazy (2013)	Somewhere Else (2014)	Real (2016)

Somewhere Else is the third studio album by American musician Lydia Loveless. It was released on February 18, 2014, by Bloodshot Records.

Somewhere Else was recorded with the same musicians that have extensively toured with Loveless. The album was recorded in two days and was produced by Loveless and engineer Joe Viers at Sonic Lounge in Columbus, Ohio.

== Songwriting ==
Loveless scrapped an entire records' worth of songs before beginning this record. The title track, "Somewhere Else," was written while at SXSW. "Really Wanna See You" was written at Loveless' husband's grandmother's house. Loveless said she used layered guitars on the song to convey an electronica feel.

“Hurts So Bad” was inspired by the tempestuous relationship between Elizabeth Taylor and Richard Burton. The song "Head" was co-written with Todd May, who plays guitar in Loveless' band. Loveless said the song went through multiple versions and took a long time to write.

"Verlaine Shot Rimbaud" was featured on a "Special Valentine's Day Edition" of NPR's Morning Edition Heavy Rotation series. It was also featured as a Rolling Stone "Daily Download." The song is about the 19th-century French poets Paul Verlaine and Arthur Rimbaud.

== Album artwork ==
The album has a quote from Verlaine's 'Aspiration' inside the cover. The album artwork was created by the Columbus, Ohio-based branding and design agency Blackletter.

== Reception ==
Professional ratings
Aggregate scores
Source	Rating
AnyDecentMusic?	7.6/10
Metacritic	81/100
Review scores
Source	Rating
AllMusic	4/5 stars
American Songwriter	4/5 stars
The A.V. Club	B+
Chicago Tribune	3.5/4 stars
Exclaim!	8/10
Los Angeles Times	3.5/4 stars
Paste	8.5/10
Pitchfork	7.3/10
Spin	8/10
Uncut	7/10

The album had an overwhelmingly good reception and entered Billboard's Heatseekers chart (new entries to Billboard charts, compiled by Nielsen SoundScan) the first week of its release at position number 7.

Paste describes the record as "an album of blood and guts and emotions—anger and yearning and lust—that are so honest and immediate that they beg to be shared. The strength in Loveless’ vocals is how deftly she moves between tough and vulnerable, the emotions in both realms sincere and familiar." Mark Deming from AllMusic notes Loveless "has developed an uncanny ability to talk about matters of the heart and soul with a lyrical voice that's graceful, keenly observed, and brutally honest."

== Track listing ==
All tracks are written by Lydia Loveless, except where noted.

Somewhere Else (CD, LP)
No.	Title	Length
1.	"Really Wanna See You"	3:56
2.	"Wine Lips"	3:42
3.	"Chris Isaak"	4:33
4.	"To Love Somebody"	4:38
5.	"Hurts So Bad"	3:33
6.	"Head"	4:21
7.	"Verlaine Shot Rimbaud"	4:38
8.	"Somewhere Else"	5:24
9.	"Everything's Gone"	4:42
10.	"They Don't Know" (Kirsty MacColl)	2:50

=== Bonus tracks ===
- "Falling Out of Love With You" - iTunes bonus track
- "Come Over" - vinyl bonus track, available via download code with purchase of vinyl
- "Blind" - 7" Record Store Day bonus tracks: Limited edition on lime green vinyl. The B-side is an exclusive Ke$ha cover. The tracks were released in digital album format May 27, 2014.

== Personnel ==
Band

- Lydia Loveless – vocals, guitar
- Todd May – guitar, vocals
- Ben Lamb – upright bass
- Nick German – drums

Additional musicians

- Jay Gasper – steel guitar
- Nate Holman – keyboards
