= Nothing's Gonna Stand in My Way Again =

Studio album by Lydia Loveless
- Released: September 22, 2023
- Length: 32:53
- Label: Bloodshot

Lydia Loveless chronology
Daughter (2020)	Nothing's Gonna Stand in My Way Again (2023)

Singles from Nothing's Gonna Stand in My Way Again
- 1. "Toothache" Released: June 12, 2023; 2. "Runaway" Released: July 24, 2023; 3. "Sex and Money" Released: August 28, 2023

Nothing's Gonna Stand in My Way Again is the sixth studio album by American musician Lydia Loveless. It was released on September 22, 2023, through Bloodshot.

== Background and singles ==
Following the release of her 2020 album Daughter through her own label, Nothing's Gonna Stand in My Way Again sees a return to her previous label Bloodshot Records. The record was created when Loveless was still living in North Carolina with her then-boyfriend and documents their breakup as well as her return to Columbus, Ohio. Loveless also faced pandemic-induced isolation when crafting the record. In January 2023, the record was ranked among the most anticipated albums of 2023 by Pitchfork.

The lead single "Toothache" was released alongside the album announcement on June 12. The track was inspired by a "literal toothache" and "millions of little things" worse than going on at the same time. The song was followed-up by "Runaway" as the second offering on July 24. A "moody midtempo" song, it was one of the first songs she wrote for the album and talks about not wanting to end a relationship. The third single "Sex and Money", "a midtempo rocker" about the attempt to become famous while being stuck in reality, was written at an Airbnb in Austin, Texas and released on August 28.

== Critical reception ==
Professional ratings
Aggregate scores
Source	Rating
Metacritic	87/100
Review scores
Source	Rating
AllMusic	4.5/5 stars
Pitchfork	7.8/10
PopMatters	9/10
Under the Radar	8/10

Nothing's Gonna Stand in My Way Again received a score of 87 out of 100 on review aggregator Metacritic based on seven critics' reviews, indicating "universal acclaim". Reviewing the album for AllMusic, Mark Deming concluded, "Since releasing their first album in 2010, Lydia Loveless has matured into one of the most compelling and consistently impressive singer/songwriters America can claim, and with Nothing's Gonna Stand in My Way Again, they have matched form and content with a skill that makes it their finest album to date -- no small statement given the strength of their catalog." Mitch Therieau of Pitchfork wrote that the album combines "a softer, more measured sound with a wryly humorous look at existential turmoil" and while Loveless's "earlier albums made deft use of sudden reversals: a flash of vulnerability followed by a sucker punch[,] here and throughout their latest and best album, they spend more time in the ambiguous middle".

== Track listing ==
Nothing's Gonna Stand in My Way Again track listing
No.	Title	Length
1.	"Song About You"	1:43
2.	"Poor Boy"	3:06
3.	"Sex and Money"	3:11
4.	"Runaway"	4:09
5.	"Feel"	4:39
6.	"Toothache"	3:46
7.	"Ghost"	3:12
8.	"Do the Right Thing"	2:27
9.	"French Restaurant"	3:41
10.	"Summerlong"	2:59
Total length:		32:53
