= Movie Madness Video =

Video rental shop and film museum in Portland, Oregon, U.S.

- Logo

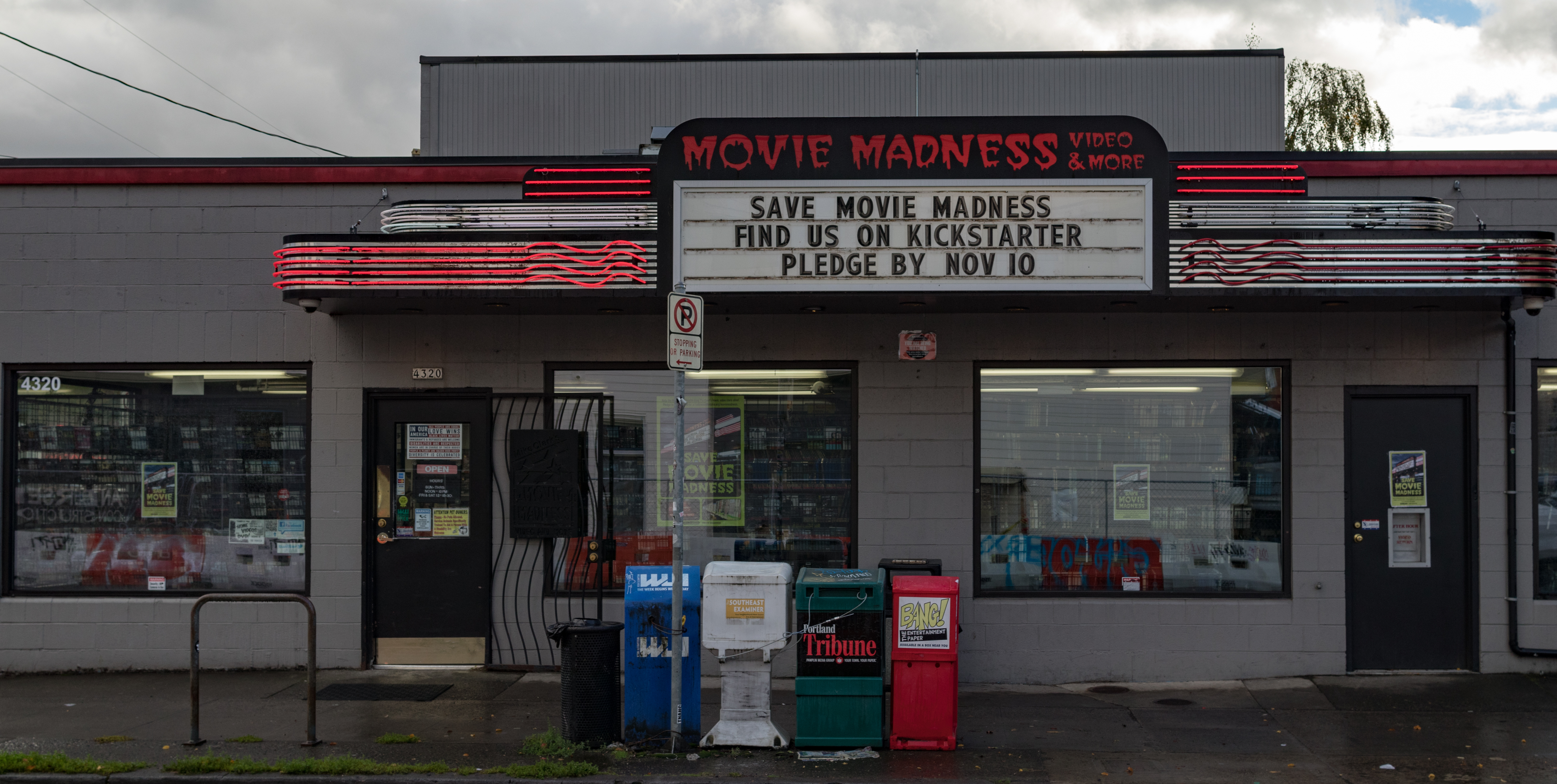
- The store's front exterior in 2017

- Location in Portland, Oregon
- Address: 4320 SE Belmont Street
- Location: Portland, Oregon, U.S.
- Coordinates: 45.51638889°N 122.61722222°W

Construction
- Opened: 1991

Website
- moviemadness.org

Movie Madness Video is a nonprofit video rental shop and museum of film history in Portland, Oregon's Sunnyside neighborhood, in the United States.

== History ==
The store was opened by Hollywood film editor Mike Clark in 1991.

After Clark approached the Hollywood Theatre in 2017 to see if they might be interested in purchasing the store, as well as its massive collection and museum. They launched a Kickstarter campaign to purchase and preserve the store. The campaign was successful, raising $250,000, enabling the theatre to purchase the business and the 80,000+ film collection. The theatre acquired ownership in 2018.

Movie Madness is slated to relocate across the street from Hollywood Theatre in 2027, as part of a grander plan to create a new "film district" in the neighborhood.

== See also ==
- Culture of Portland, Oregon
- List of museums in Portland, Oregon
- Scarecrow Video in Seattle, Washington
- VisArt Video in Charlotte, North Carolina
- Vidiots in Los Angeles, California
