= Scarecrow Video =

American nonprofit video rental organization

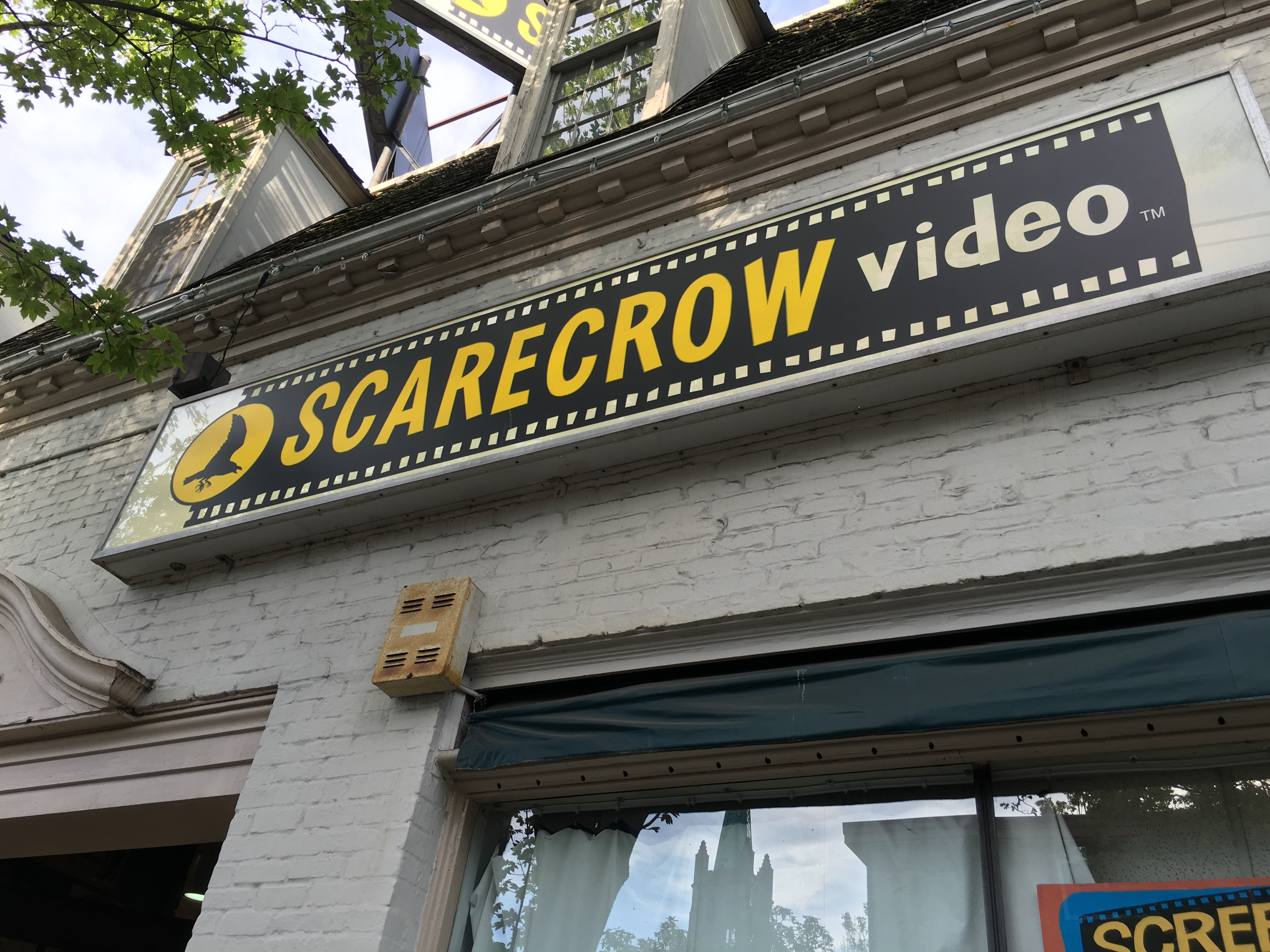
- Front of Scarecrow Video
- Founded: 1988; 38 years ago
- Founders: Rebecca and George Latsios, John McCullough
- Type: Non-profit
- Purpose: Video rental, History of film
- Headquarters: 5030 Roosevelt Way NE
- Location: Seattle, Washington, US
- Website: www.scarecrow.com

Scarecrow Video is an independently owned, non-profit video sales and rental store in Seattle, Washington, United States. It was founded in 1988 and is based in the University District neighborhood. The store has a library of 162,000 titles—among the largest in the United States—and is the last remaining video store in Seattle.

== Collection ==
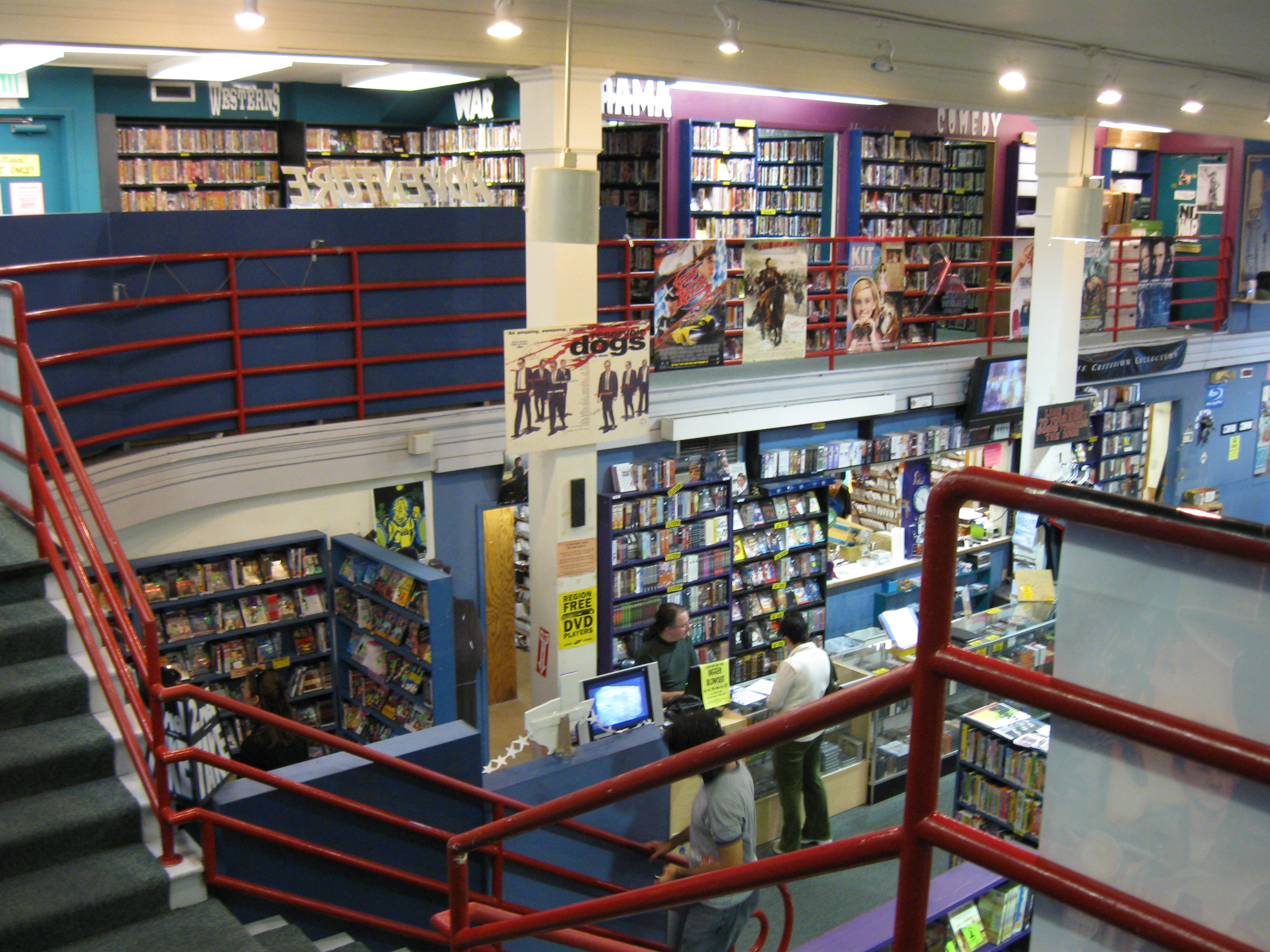
Scarecrow Video interior

Scarecrow offers a wide selection of the latest releases, as well as vintage and rare out of print releases. Their library includes over 20,000 foreign films and series, over 5,000 anime movies, and DVD players and other media devices for rental (including PAL, LaserDisc players and region free DVD players). 14,676 items are only available on VHS. 263 items are only on LaserDisc.

As of 2026, Scarecrow's collection has more than 156,000 titles. Many of them are out of print, with some requiring deposits that range from $150 – $1000. Of the top 100 rarest titles (cross-checked against various institutions' lists), 88 of them are not held by the Library of Congress. The total number of "very rare" titles in which Scarecrow may have the only publicly accessible copy is 77 out of 100. There are 129 foreign country sections, featuring about 126 languages aside from English, available in store. The earliest original release date in their collection is from 1891.

== Activities ==
In 2004, the store produced The Scarecrow Video Movie Guide, published by Sasquatch Books. Scarecrow operates on donations as well as revenue from rentals and sales. In 2024, the store reported renting out 1,800 titles a month in person and by mail since 2021. Scarecrow conducts free community film screenings, virtual film talks and classes, as well as public outdoor screenings. Scarecrow Video also hosts a weekly YouTube show, "Viva Physical Media," where employees discuss movies on VHS, DVD, and Blu-ray that they've watched from the store.

== History ==
The store was opened with 600 titles in 1988 on Latona Avenue in the Ravenna neighborhood by Rebecca and George Latsios as well as John McCullough. From the beginning the store was known as a welcome, open place for film lovers to find rare titles and be greeted by Latsios's trademark "Hello, my friend." Scarecrow moved in 1993 to its current home: a larger, two-story building on Roosevelt Way in the University District with 8,300 square feet (770 m^{2}) of space. Celebrity patrons are rumored to include Quentin Tarantino, Bridget Fonda, Courtney Love, Winona Ryder, Directors John Woo and Bernardo Bertolucci, and legendary film critic Roger Ebert.

In 1995, Latsios was diagnosed with brain cancer and given six months to live. He responded by spending large amounts on rare and unique videos, cementing the store's reputation as a Seattle icon of unique and rare titles, while ignoring other responsibilities such as federal taxes. For these reasons the store was sold in 1999. Latsios returned to his native Greece and died in 2003.

In 2014, the store nearly went out of business due to rising competition from online streaming services. In October, Scarecrow's catalog was donated by owners Carl Tostevin and Mickey McDonough to the Scarecrow Project, a group formed by current and former store employees and long-time patrons, and supported by a successful Kickstarter campaign which raised over $100,000. Scarecrow Video reopened under new ownership as a non-profit, preserving "one of the world's largest publicly available libraries of film and television". The store began offering DVD-by-mail services across the United States in 2021 for non-rare titles after a successful trial during the COVID-19 pandemic. Scarecrow is the last video rental store still operating in the Seattle city limits after the closures of the 32-year-old Video Isle store in January 2019 and Reckless Video in July 2021.

In June 2024, the Scarecrow Project announced another fundraising drive to allow the store to sign a new lease to remain at its University District location. The store estimated that it needed $1.8 million by the end of the year to continue operating. A $600,000 fundraising campaign closed in October to fund operations through 2026. SV Archive, the nonprofit that manages the store, announced in January 2026 that it had purchased the property that Scarecrow Video sits on for $5.5 million, allowing the store to operate in that location permanently as a "forever home."

== See also ==
- Movie Madness Video in Portland, Oregon
- Vidiots in Los Angeles, California
- VisArt Video in Charlotte, North Carolina
