= New Haven Documentary Film Festival =

New Haven Documentary Film Festival (also known as NHdocs) is an annual documentary film festival held in New Haven, Connecticut, in early June. Screenings take place at Yale University’s Whitney Humanities Center Auditorium, the New Haven Free Public Library and at the rock club Cafe Nine. NHdocs is a regional festival that showcases documentaries by filmmakers from the greater New Haven area and beyond. NHdocs was launched in 2014 when the film festival’s co-founders Charles Musser, Gorman Bechard, Jacob Bricca, and Lisa Molomot came together at the Big Sky Documentary Film Festival and decided to create a documentary film festival in New Haven that would “build a sense of community among documentary filmmakers from the greater New Haven area.” In 2014, the four filmmakers each showed one of their recently completed documentaries, three of which had just played at the Big Sky.

When Brica and Molomot left Connecticut to teach at University of Arizona, Bechard and Musser assumed the role of co-directors and programmers for NHdocs. The 2015 festival displayed over 20 documentaries including "first looks" at two nearly completed: Richard Wormser's NEH funded American Reds; What Must We Dream Of? and Audrey Appleby's Tiny Miracles-Awakening Memory and Emotion in an Alzheimer’s World. Brendan Toller's rock doc Danny Says, about music industry executive Danny Fields, was moderated by Timothy Young of the Beinecke Rare Book and Manuscript Library, which had recently acquired Fields' papers, and Gorman Bechard's animal welfare feature A Dog Named Gucci. Many of the films look at New Haven in terms of its openness to immigrants, the history of the New Haven Green, and efforts to combat homelessness.

In 2016, the festival grew to 11 days, featuring over 40 films, including Midsummer in Newtown, The Champions, and co-founder Bechard's own Who Is Lydia Loveless? Three Newtown/Sandy Hook-related shorts had their world premieres at the festival: Kim A. Snyder’s #WeAreAllNewtown, Notes from Dumblane and Sue Roman’s Team 26. The festival also paid tribute to documentarian Alex Gibney, with a three-day retrospective: “Revealing Scams, Lies, Trickery and Deceit: The Documentaries of Alex Gibney.” screening 5 of his feature films. Gibney himself was present for Q&A sessions, and lead a panel on filmmaking.

The Fourth Annual New Haven Documentary Film Festival ran June 1–11, 2017. The festival featured over 60 documentary features and shorts including I Am Shakespeare: the Henry Green Story, Travel Light, High School 9-1-1, and The Lavender Scare. The second weekend will conclude with a retrospective of work by D. A. Pennebaker and Chis Hegedus, including Unlocking the Cage.

The 2018 version ran from May 31 – June 10, 2018 and featured tributes to Amy Berg (documentary filmmaker), Su Friedrich, and HBO's Sheila Nevins. The festival opened with a standing-room-only presentation of a work-in-progress screening of co-director Bechard's Pizza, A Love Story, and included over 80 films such as co-director Musser's Our Family Album, Allison Argo's The Last Pig (which won the audience award for best feature film), This is Home: A Refuge Story from director Alexandra Shiva and Joe Tropea's Sickies Making Films.

In the fall of 2018, NHdocs announced its fall screening series, which will reprise a number of festivals' most popular films.

The festival kept expanding in 2019. The 6th edition running from May 30-June 9, honors America’s best-known documentarian, Michael Moore. The second weekend of the festival (June 7-9) will feature seven of his most notable works, including the 30th-anniversary screening of Roger & Me, Bowling for Columbine, Where to Invade Next, Fahrenheit 9/11 and Fahrenheit 11/9. All the films will feature Moore joined in conversation by other award-winning documentary filmmakers, including D.A. Pennebaker, Chris Hegedus and Peter Davis. In all, NHdocs will screen over 100 documentaries at five venues. There will also be a student film competition, filmmaking workshops, awards, works-in-progress screenings, panels, and musical performances.

In 2020, co-founder Musser departed NHdocs. Bechard became Executive Director, while Katherine Kowalczyk, the longtime festival manager, became Director. The 7th edition of the festival moved to August due to Covid-19, but still screened over 120 films online and in-person, and also included a student competition, a quarantine film challenge, workshops, Q&As, and a tribute to Johnny Cash with a screening of My Darling Vivian. The festival also featured the World Premiere of Mister Wonderland, screenings of Abby Ginsberg's Waging Change, Gorman Bechard's Seniors A Dogumentary, and When Liberty Burns from Dudley Alexis.

In its second Covid-ravaged year, and for its 8th edition, in 2021 NHdocs screened over 120 films online and in-person, and once again included a student competition, online workshops, Q&As, a screening of the film "From the Left Hand" with a performance by its subject Norman Malone, and a tribute to feminist filmmaker Beth B with a live performance by Lydia Lunch.

In 2022, the festival moved to the fall, running for 11 days in October, screening 116 films at 4 locations around New Haven including The New Haven Free Public Library and the Bow-Tie Criterion Cinema. Opening night brought the first ever northeast performance from musician Mike Hosty after a screening of the documentary on his life, Oklahoma Breakdown, while closing night saw a screening of The Greatest Radio Station in the World, a film about Bridgeport radio station WPKN, and featured a dance party with Chris Frantz of Talking Heads spinning records alongside other notable DJs from the station after the screening. Both of those screenings took place at New Haven's Cafe Nine. Other notable screenings included To the End from filmmaker Rachel Lears, Sam Now, Jack Has A Plan, Esther Newton Made Me Gay, Body Parts, A Life on the Farm, and Catching Air, a documentary about the air guitar championship with NHdocs' first and last ever air guitar contest after the screening. Oklahoma Breakdown won the festival's Golden Slice Award for Best Feature Film, while Deerwoods Deathtrap won the award for Best Short Film. In the NHdocs Student Competition, First Place for Best College Film went to From 3 to 3, from directors Xingyan Guo, Scout Raimondo, & Jared Yao of Wesleyan University. While First Place for Best Middle School/Highschool Film was awarded to The Fisherman of the 150th District, from Melina Silvestro of Mamaroneck High School.

In October 2023, after a ten year run, NHdocs shuttered. The loss of available screening venues in the New Haven area was cited by Bechard as the main reason. The final film screening from NHdocs: the New Haven Documentary Film Festival occurred, in partnership with CompassionFest, on Wednesday, October 9th at The Cannon in New Haven. The last film screened was Humans and Other Animals.
