= VisArt Video =

American nonprofit video rental organization

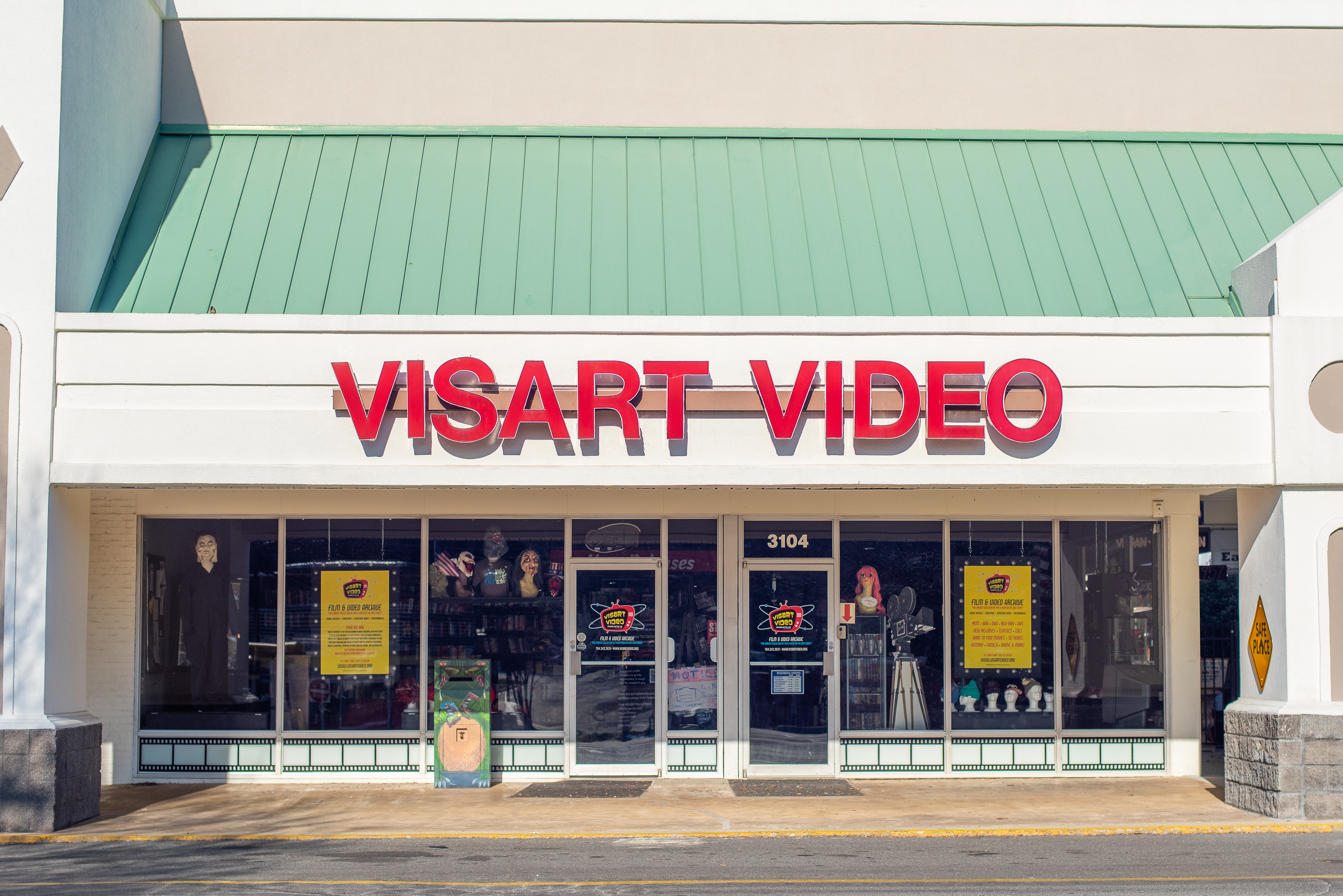
- VisArt Storefront
- Founded: 1985; 41 years ago
- Type: Non-profit
- Purpose: Video rental, History of film
- Headquarters: 3104 Eastway Drive
- Location: Charlotte, North Carolina, US
- Coordinates: 35°12′50.01″N 80°46′56.63″W
- Website: visartvideo.net

VisArt Video is a non-profit video rental store located in Charlotte, North Carolina. It holds the largest film and video collection on the East Coast of the United States, with approximately 50,000 titles.

== Collection ==
VisArt's collection of VHS, DVD and Blu-ray includes approximately 50,000 titles. The collection includes rare titles, particularly VHS, and at one point included one of the four known copies of Spike Lee's college dissertation.

== History ==
VisArt began in 1985 in Durham, North Carolina. By 2010 VisArt was the last remaining video rental store in Charlotte, North Carolina, when Mickey Aberman became a co-owner. In 2015 VisArt moved from its original 7th Street location to its current location in Eastway Crossing plaza and later expanded to include a 50-person indoor theater for screenings. In 2016 Aberman became the sole owner. Following the model of video rental stores like Movie Madness, Scarecrow Video, and Vidiots, VisArt began the process of converting to a 501(c)(3) nonprofit organization in 2018 and completed the process in January 2021.

VisArt was the recipient of a $40,000 grant from Charlotte Center City Partners and Honeywell to install a garage door between their exterior wall and the neighboring establishment's patio in order to expand their theater to accommodate outdoor seating.

== See also ==
- Movie Madness Video in Portland, Oregon
- Scarecrow Video in Seattle, Washington
