= Hell's Half Mile Film & Music Festival =

Film festival

- Location: Bay City, Michigan
- Founded: 2006
- Language: English
- Website: hhmfest.com

Hell's Half Mile Film & Music Festival is an annual independent film and music film festival held each September in Bay City, Michigan. The four-day festival includes feature and short film screenings and live music events.

== History ==
The festival was founded in 2006 by festival director Alan LaFave and Tommy Jenkins. It was initially conceived as a way to bring independent film and music to Bay City. Drawing approximately 600 people in its first year, by its ninth year the festival drew 3,600 people. The festival is named after a stretch of downtown Bay City's riverfront known as Hell's Half Mile in the mid-to-late 1800s, when it was lined with saloons and brothels. At the time, Bay City was a big logging community. Loggers and shipmen would come into Bay City to spend their paychecks, gamble and get into fights on the Hell's Half Mile strip.

In addition to independent films and indie bands, it includes social events, workshops, panels and a half-mile race. Starting in 2015, the festival partnered with Seed&Spark for a Crowdfunding Rally, where filmmakers can submit upcoming projects for potential audience funding. Films are screened at venues included the State Theatre, Delta College Planetarium and the Historic Masonic Temple. Past jury members include Damien Chazelle and Rider Strong, and past musical acts include Matt Pond PA, Jamaican Queens and the Detroit Party Marching Band.

With 2020 being cancelled caused by the COVID-19 pandemic, only the pop-up cinema & certain other events will be done remotely.

== Award winners ==
=== Jury Award: Best Feature ===
- Remote Area Medical (2013)
- Metalhead (2014)
- Lamb (2015)
- Donald Cried (2016)
- The Scent of Rain and Lightning (2017)
- Funny Story (2018)

=== Audience Award: Fest Best ===
- Can Mr. Smith Get to Washington Anymore? (2007)
- Dakota Skye (2008)
- The Happy Poet (2010)
- Irish Twins (2011)
- Missed Connections (2012)
- A Band Called Death (2013)
- The Bachelor Weekend (2014)
- A Dog Named Gucci (2015)
- Delinquent (2016)
- Stigmatic: Our Opioid Crisis (2017)

=== Programmers' Standout ===
- Bad Dog and Superhero (2007)
- More Shoes (2008)
- Lebanon, PA (2010)
- Maria My Love (2011)
- Louder Than Love: The Grande Ballroom Story (2012)
- Things I Don't Understand (2013)
- Universal Language (2014)
- Stuck (2015)
- Creedmoria (2016)
- Bark (2017)

== See also ==
- List of festivals in Michigan
