= Real (Lydia Loveless album) =

Studio album by Lydia Loveless
- Released: August 19, 2016
- Recorded: Columbus, Ohio
- Genres: Alternative country, Americana
- Length: 38:49
- Label: Bloodshot Records
- Producers: Lydia Loveless, Joe Viers

Lydia Loveless chronology
Somewhere Else (2014)	Real (2016)	Boy Crazy and Single(s) (2017)

Professional ratings
Aggregate scores
Source	Rating
Metacritic	84/100
Review scores
Source	Rating
AllMusic	4/5 stars
The A.V. Club	A−
The Boston Globe	8/10
Exclaim!	8/10

Real is the fourth studio album by American musician Lydia Loveless. It was released on August 19, 2016 by Bloodshot Records.

== Background ==
The record is a continued collaboration (after two records and one EP) between Loveless and engineer Joe Viers, who recorded the record at Viers' Grove City, Ohio Sonic Lounge Studios.

== Critical reception ==
Real was featured as part of NPR Music's First Listen series.

Writing for Exclaim!, Sarah Green hailed Loveless' "flickering, torchy voice".

=== Accolades ===
Publication	Accolade	Year	Rank
American Songwriter	Top 50 Albums of 2016	2016	26
The A.V. Club	The A.V. Club's Top 50 Albums of 2016	2016	15
Stereogum	The 50 Best Albums of 2016	2016	47

== Track listing ==
All tracks are written by Lydia Loveless.

Real (CD, LP)
No.	Title	Length
1.	"Same to You"	3:54
2.	"Longer"	3:57
3.	"More Than Ever"	3:34
4.	"Heaven"	4:37
5.	"Out on Love"	3:49
6.	"Midwestern Guys"	3:04
7.	"Bilbao"	4:50
8.	"European"	4:47
9.	"Clumps"	2:00
10.	"Real"	4:14
