= Attaxe =

American thrash metal band

- Origin: Orange County, California, USA
- Genres: Thrash metal, speed metal, heavy metal
- Years active: 1985–1994
- Labels: PMRC
- Members: Mike Bonaventura (1985–1994); Jim Houle (1985–1994); Swen Rolfs (1993–1994)
- Past members: Todd May (1985–1992); Tim Cason (1989–1992); Michael Whyte (1986–1988); Gary Sebourn (1986–1988); Robbie Perkins (1988–1989); Jeff Manino (1988–1989)
- Website: attaxe.com

Attaxe was an American thrash metal band from California. The band played extensively in Southern California and the Bay Area through the early nineties headlining smaller clubs and as opening act for such notable thrash/metal bands as Anthrax, Testament, Metal Church, Danzig, King Diamond, Sacred Reich, Meliah Rage and Vio-Lence. Attaxe was invited by Vio-lence to be an opening act on the infamous Oppressing The Masses album release show in June 1990 at the Omni in Oakland, CA.

Attaxe was featured on the premiere issue No. 1 of the video magazine "Tales From The Pit" released in 1990. According to TFTP creator Jerry Allen in 2008 "Attaxe (this line up(1990)) was definitely our favorite unsigned band from back in the day. Although a SOCAL band, they sounded more like Bay Area Thrash in the same league as Vio-lence and Testament. These guys should have been huge in our opinion. We still play their Lethal Deception demo to this day. Skelly was definitely one of the best frontmen we've seen. Too bad this band didn't do more. The video we filmed was for Tales From The Pit No. 1. It was recorded shortly before the band's Lethal Deception demo came out. The audio is from a live Hollywood metal show and is a mono board recording. Even with its limitations, the live audio shows what a vicious band they were out of the studio. I prefer this live version of "Living in Fear" over the polished demo version. It's way more raw and ripping. Would love to see a reunion."

The band officially disbanded in 1994.

In 2009 Attaxe members Bonaventura, Cason, Houle and May re-grouped and began writing new material.

== History ==
=== Original lineup ===
Attaxe was formed in the Orange County, California area in 1985 by guitarists Mike Bonaventura & Todd May and drummer Jim Houle. The band soon recruited bassist Gary Sebourn and vocalist Michael Whyte and played their first show on December 6, 1986, at "Big John's Billiards" in Fullerton, California.

=== Changes in formation ===
The core of the band (Bonaventura, Houle, May) stayed the same throughout most of its history, however there were four different vocalists which provided a distinctly different sound and style. Three of the four were recorded as follows:

- 1986-1988 Michael Whyte "July 4th EP Demo"
- 1988-1989 Robbie Perkins "Unit G EP"
- 1989-1992 Tim "Skelly" Cason "Displaced EP" & "Lethal Deception EP"
- 1993-1994 Swen Rolfs (no known recording exists from this period)

== Members ==
Attaxe had several lineup changes with Mike Bonaventura and Jim Houle being the only constant members.

- Mike Bonaventura – guitarist/founding member (1985–1994)
- Jim Houle – drums/founding member (1985–1994)
- Todd May – guitarist/founding member (1985–1992)
- Tim Cason – bass/vocals (1989–1992)
- Michael Whyte – vocals (1986–1988)
- Robbie Perkins – vocals (1988–1989)
- Swen Rolfs – vocals (1993–1994)
- Gary Sebourn – bass (1986–1988)
- Jeff Manino – bass (1988–1989)

== Discography ==
- July 4th EP (demo) (1987)
- Unit G EP (1988)
- Displaced EP (1989)
- Lethal Deception EP (1990)
- Banned in L.A./Band Together/Mosh on Fire (1992/PMRC/Dr. Dream Records)
