= Big Sky Documentary Film Festival =

Big Sky Documentary Film Festival is an annual non-fiction film festival held in Missoula, Montana each February. The event showcases documentary films from around the world. The festival first began in 2003 as a seven-day event. It is now a ten-day event. The Big Sky Documentary Film Festival is the largest cinema event in Montana. The festival presents an average of 150 non-fiction films annually at the historic Wilma Theater, The Top Hat, The Roxy Theater, and Crystal Theater in downtown Missoula.

BSDFF hosts DocShop an industry-focused feature of the festival that offers documentary filmmakers opportunities for networking, discussion, and professional development. The schedule includes workshops, Work-In-Progress presentations, panels, and the annual Big Sky Pitch session. DocShop's participants have included: HBO Documentary Films, Participant Media, BBC Storyville, CNN Films, ITVS, POV, PBS, Tribeca Film Institute, Sundance Doc Fund, Chicken & Egg Pictures, The Fledgling Fund and Catapult Film Fund.

Recent award winners at the festival have included Last of the Elephant Men (Daniel Ferguson, Arnaud Bouquet), Siblings are Forever (Frode Fimland), A World Not Ours (Mahdi Fleifel), Blood Brother (Steve Hoover), Slomo (Joshua Izenberg), Chasing Ice (Jeff Orlowski), This Way Of Life (Thomas Burstyn), Last Train Home (Lixin Fan), and Gasland (Josh Fox), Rough Aunties (Kim Longinotto), Sweetgrass (Ilisa Barbash & Lucien Castaing-Taylor), Jimmy Rosenberg: The Father, The Son, and the Talent (Jeroen Berkvens), Favela Rising (Jeff Zimbalist), The Cats of Mirikitani, (Linda Hattendorf), Citizen King (Orlando Bagwell & W. Noland Walker), and Horns and Halos, (Michael Galinsky & Suki Hawley).

Special retrospective programs have included: Agi Orsi, Barbara Kopple, Brendan Canty, Caveh Zahedi, Christoph Green, Chuck Workman, Dana & Hart Perry, Doug Pray, Jerry Blumenthal, Joe Berlinger, John Cohen, Kartemquin Films, Les Blank, Lucy Walker (director), Maysles Brothers, Ondi Timoner, Robert B. Weide, Ron Mann, Sam Green, Stanley Nelson, and Steve James.

Special guests have included indie rock legends Yo La Tengo, Grant Hart, and Lydia Loveless. Comedians Tig Notaro and Chris Fairbanks.

Films shown at the 2024 event included !Aitsa, Bring Them Home / Aiskótáhkapiyaaya, Iniskim-Return of the Buffalo and Final Vows.
