= What Did You Expect? (film) =

- poster
- Directed by: Gorman Bechard
- Produced by: Gorman Bechard
- Cinematography: Gorman Bechard; Sarah Hajtol; Adrian Correia; Jan Radder; Andrew Ross; Cory C. Maffucci
- Edited by: Gorman Bechard
- Production company: What Were We Thinking Films
- Release date: 2012
- Running time: 89 minutes
- Country: United States
- Language: English

What Did You Expect? is a live concert documentary capturing the Archers of Loaf reunion tour. Directed by Gorman Bechard, it made its film festival debut in June, 2012.

== Plot ==
Indie rock icons the Archers of Loaf reunited in 2011, and during the course of their reunion tour played two legendary concerts at Cat's Cradle in Chapel Hill, NC. Combining in-your-face concert footage along with rare interviews of the band, this film by director Gorman Bechard documents those concerts, and captures the excitement and explosive energy of what its like to see this extraordinary band perform live.

== Release ==
The film is being distributed by MVD Entertainment, and was released on DVD in November 2012. It is also available on iTunes, Hulu, and Video-on-Demand.

== Critical response ==
Writing in Punk News, John Gentile said, "The wilder songs, like 'Audiowhore' where bassist Matt Gentling just gets completely down, stomping around like a T-rex, are nearly berserk, with the band approaching a Stooges-type thrash. 'What Did You Expect?' could pass for Fugazi's wilder side. Gentling just goes nuts on the bass, which is wild. Likewise, the mid-tempo songs like "Freezing Point" have an inherent urgency."
