= Color Me Obsessed =

- Promotional release poster
- Directed by: Gorman Bechard
- Screenplay by: Pen-Ek Ratanaruang
- Produced by: Hansi Oppenheimer; Gorman Bechard
- Cinematography: Gorman Bechard; Adam Correia; Sarah Hajtol
- Edited by: Gorman Bechard
- Production company: What Were We Thinking Films
- Release date: March 26, 2011 (Gasparilla International Film Festival)
- Running time: 123 minutes
- Country: United States
- Language: English

Color Me Obsessed is a 2011 American documentary film directed, edited and co-produced by Gorman Bechard about the alternative rock band the Replacements.

== Plot ==
Unlike traditional music documentaries; Color Me Obsessed features no licensed music or live footage, instead featuring interviews with fans of the band telling the story of the Replacements. Included in the documentary are interviews with members of Hüsker Dü, the Goo Goo Dolls, the Hold Steady, the Decemberists, the Gaslight Anthem, Babes in Toyland, as well as average fans who simply enjoy the band.

== Release ==
The film is distributed by MVD Entertainment, and was released on DVD in November 2012. The film has been screened at the following festivals:

- Tampa, Florida - Gasparilla International Film Festival, March 26, 2011
- Madison, Wisconsin - Wisconsin Film Festival, March 5, 2011
- Chicago, Illinois - CIMMfest 2011, April 15, 2011
- Boston, Massachusetts - Independent Film Festival Boston, April 28, 2011
- Minneapolis, Minnesota - Sound Unseen Festival, May 4 & 5, 2011
- Duluth, Minnesota - Sound Unseen International Duluth Film & Music Festival, June 11, 2011
- Toronto, Ontario, Canada - NXNE Festival and Conference, June 17
- Calgary, Alberta, Canada - Sled Island Music and Arts Festival, June 21, 2011
- San Francisco, California - Frozen Film Festival, July 9, 2011
- Boulder, Colorado - DocuWest, September 2011
- Philadelphia, Pennsylvania - Philly Film & Music Festival, September 24, 2011
- Bay City, Michigan - Hell's Half Mile, September 30, 2011
- Seattle, Washington - Northwest Film Festival, October 21, 22, and 23, 2011
- Los Angeles, California - Downtown Independent, November 3 and 4, 2011
- New Orleans, Louisiana - Zeitgeist Cinema, January 20 and 21, 2012
- Albuquerque, New Mexico - Guild Cinema, January 26 through February 1, 2012
- Washington, DC - Black Cat Bar, March 9, 2012
- Melbourne, Australia - Gerschwin Room, March 29, 2012
- Stockholm, Sweden - Bio Rio, April 12, 201
- Atlanta, Georgia - The Earl Bar, April 12, 2012
- Providence, Rhode Island - Cable Car Cinema, April 21, 2012
- Austin, Texas - Alamo Drafthouse, April 30, 2012
- Columbus, Ohio - Reelin' & Rockin' at Gateway Film Center, October 17, 2012
- Cleveland, Ohio - Rock and Roll Hall of Fame and Museum, December 12, 2012

== Reception ==
David Browne of Rolling Stone called the film one of "the seven best new music documentaries of the year." Dan Schoenbrun of Filmmaker wrote: "Gorman Bechard's Color Me Obsessed is the rare music documentary that lavishes admiration not only onto its subject, rowdy Minneapolis cult rock band The Replacements, but on the band's fans as well." Peter Gerstenzang of The Village Voice called the film "pretty original", writing: "With so many voices, Color Me becomes a rock version of Rashomon, and what the film lacks in music and live footage, it more than makes up for with obsessive detail and heated debate."
