= Every Everything: The Music, Life & Times of Grant Hart =

- poster
- Directed by: Gorman Bechard
- Produced by: Gorman Bechard; Jan Radder
- Cinematography: Gorman Bechard; Sarah Hajtol
- Edited by: Gorman Bechard
- Production company: What Were We Thinking Films
- Release date: October 6, 2013 (Raindance Film Festival)
- Running time: 93 minutes
- Country: United States
- Language: English

Every Everything: The Music, Life & Times of Grant Hart is a 2013 documentary film by Gorman Bechard that chronicles the life of Hüsker Dü drummer/singer/songwriter Grant Hart. The film made its American festival debut in October 2013 at the Raindance Film Festival.

== Plot ==
Told in the style of the Errol Morris film The Fog of War, Hart is the film's only interview subject taking us through his life, from birth right up to the recording of his final album before his death: The Argument.

"Between discussions of his love of the art form of collage (his love of art coming from his father, a man that taught drafting), his fascination with Studebaker cars (especially the 1955 Studebaker Champion he rebuilt), the kind of drumsticks he uses and his drum set up, he speaks candidly. Everything is fair game.".

== Release ==
The film is extensively played the film festival circuit, and was the opening night film for the Sound Unseen Film & Music Festival in Minneapolis. It was released on DVD in August 2014 from MVD Entertainment. It was also released on DVD and Hulu in October 2014.

== Critical response ==
Peter Gerstenzang called the film "beautifully sad" in The Village Voice.

Writing in City Pages, Reed Fischer said, "In spite of the myriad challenges of his personal and professional life -- the fire, the death of family members, his band's epic dissolution, drug addiction, and coming to terms with his sexual orientation -- Hart comes off as a wiser man for all of it. Hearing the way he describes his close emotional friendship with William S. Burroughs is worth the price of admission on its own. Sure, there are numerous bits about Mr. Mould and Mr. Norton too, and they're mostly told with fondness for the fruit before it became poisoned. Hart's slow and deliberate retellings of his past convey an inner strength that hints at why Bechard wanted to spend so much time with him. Capping the tale with the beginnings of Hart's epic interpretation of John Milton's Paradise Lost, The Argument -- Chris Strouth has a lot more to say about the album here -- the story rests itself in the near-present at a high point in Hart's storied career. Not every stone was turned over in this tale, but they all at least got a firm jostling."

While Danny R. Phillips of Blurt Magazine felt, "Hart is a man with a story to tell and Bechard’s film is a near perfect place to hear that story. All you have to do is sit down, watch and listen.".

Peter Gerstenzang, writing in The Village Voice, adds, "Bechard's film eloquently imparts that brilliance (like former Hüsker Dü drummer Hart's), is often more hindrance than help, whether filming the musician standing in a vacant lot where his house burned down—and remembering where everything was—or holding forth on poet John Milton (who inspired his new album). This documentary dynamically reminds us that smarts don't ensure success or happiness.".

Paul Bower of Tiny Mix Tapes said, "Bechard has done that rare thing in documentary filmmaking. He’s fully allowed his subject to dictate the tone of the film. As an audience, we’re better off because of it."
