= List of Italian-American neighborhoods =

There are localized concentrations of Italian Americans in many metropolitan areas of the United States, especially in the industrial cities of the Northeast and Midwest, as well as certain cities in California. Today, the state of New York has the largest population of Italian-Americans, while Rhode Island and Connecticut have the highest overall percentages in relation to their respective populations.

In contrast, most of the rest of the country (exceptions being South Florida and New Orleans) have fewer Italian-American concentrations.

According to a recent United Census Bureau estimate, 17.8 million Americans are of Italian descent. Communities of Italian Americans were established in many major industrial cities of the early 20th century, such as Baltimore (particularly Little Italy, Baltimore), Boston (particularly in the North End and East Boston) along with numerous nearby cities and towns, Philadelphia proper (particularly South Philadelphia) and the Philadelphia metro area (particularly neighborhoods in Delco, Atlantic City, Little Italy, Wilmington; and Vineland), Pittsburgh (particularly Bloomfield), Northeastern Pennsylvania cities, Lehigh Valley cities, Detroit, Providence (particularly Federal Hill), St. Louis (particularly The Hill), Chicago, Kansas City, Milwaukee, Youngstown, Erie, Cleveland, Buffalo, Newark, Utica, Syracuse, New York's Capital District, and New York City, which boasts the largest Italian-American population, which live in several concentrated communities in the New York metropolitan area, including the five boroughs, Long Island, Westchester County, Fairfield County and North Jersey. New Orleans, Louisiana was the first site of immigration of Italians into America in the 19th century, before Italy was a unified nation-state. This was before New York Harbor and Baltimore became the preferred destinations for Italian immigrants.

== Alabama ==
- Daphne – Prior to the 1978 annexation of the Lake Forest subdivision, Daphne was a heavily Italian community, and pre-1978 Daphne territory remains Italian, with street names such as Guarisco. The Archdiocese of Mobile considers Christ the King Parish in Daphne an Italian-American parish.

== Arizona ==
- North Phoenix
- Scottsdale has an Italian community

== Arkansas ==
- Lake Village, a farming community in southeastern Arkansas, enticed a number of families from northern Italy to become sharecroppers in the 1890s. Following a harsh and deadly winter, about half the families left and established Tontitown, west of Fayetteville, Arkansas in Benton/Washington counties.
- Little Italy in unincorporated northern Pulaski County near Little Rock.

== California ==
=== Northern California ===
- Cotati – Italian community in the area's grape-growing industry.
- Excelsior District, San Francisco – Italian-American Social Club is on Russia St., and Calabria Brothers Deli is around the corner on Mission Street.
- Fresno and some Italian descendants in portions of the San Joaquin Valley (i.e. Kern County with its grape industry).
- Gilroy – Italian community in the area's grape-growing industry.
- "Italian Colony", Oakland.
- Marin County (Albert Park, San Rafael).
- Napa – Little Italy is the East Napa historic neighborhoods of First-Juarez-Third Streets and Alta Heights. The Napa Valley wine industry owes its heritage to Italian vintners.
- North Beach, San Francisco – baseball legend Joe DiMaggio grew up here. The Italian Heritage Parade (formerly the Columbus Day Parade) is the oldest in the U.S. and one of the largest. North Beach is also the home of City Lights Books, which helped to give birth to the Beats literary movement.
- Sacramento metro area – descendants of the 1849 California Gold Rush. In December 2021, 49th to 59th streets and J Street to Folsom Boulevard of East Sacramento was designated as "Little Italy". The neighborhood historically had many Italian immigrants in the early 1900s, with businesses about, with lesser in number today.
- San Jose – San Jose's old Italian neighborhoods are Goose Town, North San Jose and the River Street/San Pedro Neighborhood. Each of these neighborhoods consisted of an Italian Church built by the Italian American community. The River Street Neighborhood is currently being revitalized and is now referred to as Little Italy San Jose. This neighborhood is located adjacent to the SAP Center and is anchored by a Gateway Arch and Italian Cultural Center & Museum and has several authentic Italian businesses.
- Santa Cruz County – CA coastal county.
- Sonoma County –the Italian Swiss Colony coop founded in the 1880s by Andrea Sbarbaro from Switzerland.
- Spaghetti Hill, Monterey – birthplace of former Secretary of Defense Leon Panetta. The Salinas Valley also has many Italian descendants.
- South San Francisco – sizable Italian community.
- Stockton – descendants of the 1849 California Gold Rush.
- Temescal, Oakland was thriving with Italian immigrants since the 1960s.

=== Southern California ===
- Altadena/ Pasadena – once had a Little Italy. Nearby Arcadia and Monrovia is where the area's Italian community moved to.
- Beaumont – grape industry.
- Camarillo – wine and grape industry.
- Desert Ridge/Sun City Shadow Hills, Indio.
- Fontana – wine and grape industry.
- Highland.
- Los Angeles
  - Downtown Los Angeles (Fashion District), Italian community currently located around S Los Angeles Blvd.
  - Formerly Lincoln Heights, Los Angeles (East Los Angeles (region)) which had a Little Italy, before they relocated to nearby Alhambra and Montebello. Casa Italiana, further n on N Broadway, near Solono Canyon is a historical hall of Italian heritage.
  - Italian American Museum of Los Angeles
  - Via Italia, San Pedro
- Long Beach has a community, among others in LA metro area.
- The Coachella Valley – Order of Sons of Italy America has a group there.
  - Palm Springs has a neighborhood known as Little Tuscany, and the neighborhoods of Las Palmas and the Movie Colony.
- San Diego – Little Italy also in Point Loma.
- Ventura/Oxnard.

== Colorado ==
- Denver – "Little Italy" has its roots in the Highlands neighborhood of North Denver. Italian miners, railroad workers and farmers developed Colorado in the late 19th century, and northern Italians are well represented. And South Denver along with Cherry Creek has a number of Italian-Americans.
- Pueblo – Hundreds of Sicilians, particularly, settled in Pueblo at the turn of the 20th century. They have influenced the culture of the city powerfully.
- Trinidad – retirement community in the Sunbelt region of the US typically have many elderly Italian-Americans from the east coast.

== Connecticut ==
19.3% of Connecticut's population claims Italian ancestry, making it the second most Italian state in the U.S. after Rhode Island.

- Beacon Falls
- Berlin
- Bridgeport
  - Little Italy
- Bristol
- Cheshire
- Cos Cob
- Danbury
- Derby
- East Haven (43% of residents claim Italian ancestry)
- Fair Haven
- Guilford
- Hamden
- Hartford
  - Franklin Avenue, known as Little Italy of Hartford
- Madison
- Meriden
- Middlebury
- Middletown
  - Large Sicilian population
- Milford
- Monroe
- Naugatuck
- New Haven
  - Wooster Square (Little Italy of New Haven) – home of Frank Pepe Pizzeria Napoletana, Sally's Apizza, and a vast number of other purveyors of Apizza
- North Branford
- North Haven
- Norwalk
- Orange
- Oxford
- Prospect
- Seymour
- Southbury
- Southington
- Stamford
  - West Side
- Torrington
- Waterbury
- West Haven

== Delaware ==
- Little Italy, Wilmington
- Shawtown, New Castle

== Florida ==
- Fort Lauderdale – Little Italy Neighborhood Oakland & A1A near Galt Ocean Mile.
- Miami
- Boca Raton
- Naples
- Pompano Beach
- Port St. Lucie
- Tampa / Ybor City

== Illinois ==
- Chicago:
  - Armour Square
  - Little Italy
- Berwyn
- Chicago Heights
- East Brooklyn
- Elmwood Park
- Franklin Park
- Herrin
- Melrose Park
- Norridge
- Peoria
- River Grove
- Rockford
- Rosemont
- Schiller Park
- South Wilmington

== Indiana ==
- Indianapolis – The Holy Rosary Neighborhood ("Indy Little Italy")
- Gary – Midtown
- Clinton

== Louisiana ==
- Independence – 30.7% Italian American
- Kenner
- Marrero
- New Orleans
  - French Quarter nicknamed "Little Palermo"
- Metairie

== Maine ==
- India Street, Portland
- Munjoy Hill, Portland (mostly historical)

== Maryland ==
- Baltimore:
  - Highlandtown
  - Little Italy
  - Locust Point
  - Lombard Street
- Bel Air
- Elkridge
- Essex
- Joppatowne
- Laurel
- Middle River
- Parkville
- Perry Hall
- Towson

== Massachusetts ==
- Boston:
  - East Boston (Orient Heights)
  - Hyde Park (Readville)
  - North End (Little Italy of Boston)
- Brockton – birthplace of boxing champ Rocky Marciano
- East Cambridge
- Everett
- Framingham
- Gloucester
- Holyoke (Oakdale)
- Lawrence
- Leominster
- Lowell
- Lynn
- Medford
- Melrose
- Milford
- Newton:
  - Nonantum
- Northampton, Massachusetts
- Methuen, Massachusetts – Merrimack Street
- Revere, Massachusetts
- Saugus
- Somerville
- South Quincy in Quincy
- Springfield (South-End)
- Taunton
- Waltham
- West Springfield, Massachusetts
- Worcester – Shrewsbury Street

== Michigan ==
- Caspian
- Clinton Township, Macomb County
- Deerton
- Detroit (Eastern Market is sometimes referred to as Detroit's "Little Italy" and has fewer Italian-Americans and Italian residents than it did in the early 1900s, but some Italian stores and businesses in the area; East Detroit generally had a higher proportion of Italian immigrants and Italian-Americans)
- Gaastra
- Loretto
- Macomb
- Norway
- Saint Clair Shores (certain areas)

== Minnesota ==
- Minneapolis – St. Paul area: West 7th Street and "Nord-east" Minneapolis is an Italian area.
  - Beltrami
- Northern Minnesota Iron Mines region –
  - Aurora
  - Duluth
  - Hibbing

== Mississippi ==
- Mississippi Delta –
  - Greenville
  - Indianola
  - Leland

== Missouri ==
- The Hill, Saint Louis – Three famous baseball figures—Yogi Berra, Harry Caray and Joe Garagiola—grew up here.
- Kansas City – The northeast side is a "Little Italy" neighborhood called Columbus Park, known for its Italian culture.

== Nebraska ==
- Little Italy, Omaha

== Nevada ==
- Las Vegas
- Sparks
- Reno

== New Hampshire ==
- Portsmouth

== New Jersey ==
New Jersey municipalities with over 25% of the population identifying themselves as of Italian ancestry (in those municipalities where at least 1,000 residents identified their ancestry):

- Fairfield – 50.3% (highest percentage for a town in the United States)
- Hammonton – 45.9% (second highest percentage for a town in the United States)
- Dover Beaches South – 42.8%
- East Hanover – 41.3%
- Totowa – 37.7%
- South Hackensack – 36.3%
- Nutley – 36.0%
- Woodland Park (formerly West Paterson) – 34.3%
- Moonachie – 34.1%
- Lyndhurst – 33.8%
- Buena – 33.5%
- Lodi – 33.3%
- Rutherford – 33.2%
- Ocean Gate – 32.5%
- Carlstadt – 31.2%
- Hasbrouck Heights – 30.8%
- West Long Branch – 30.5%
- Netcong – 30.1%
- Gibbstown – 30.1%
- Raritan – 30.1%
- Newfield – 29.8%
- Saddle Brook – 29.8%
- Cedar Grove – 29.7%
- Greenwich Township – 29.3%
- Glendora – 28.7%
- Belleville – 28.7%
- Little Falls – 28.6%
- Wayne – 28.4%
- Kenilworth – 28.0%
- Oceanport – 27.7%
- Lavallette – 27.7%
- North Arlington – 27.4%
- Longport – 27.3%
- Folsom – 27.3%
- Hawthorne – 26.5%
- Bloomfield – 26.4%
- Rochelle Park – 26.1%
- Washington Township – 25.9%
- Mystic Island – 25.9%
- Seaside Heights – 25.7%
- Blackwood – 25.5%
- Belford – 25.3%
- Riverdale – 25.1%
- East Rutherford – 25.1%

Other places in New Jersey

- Asbury Park
- Atlantic City
  - Ducktown
- Bayonne (20.1% Italian American)
- Camden
- Clifton
- Elizabeth
  - Peterstown neighborhood was densely populated with about 90% Italian-Americans. It became less populated with Italians towards the late 1970s.
- Freehold Township (22.0% Italian-American)
- Garfield
- Hackensack
- Hoboken – Four popular Italian-American celebrities—Frank Sinatra, Buddy Valastro, Jimmy Roselli and Joe Pantoliano—grew up here.
- Howell Township (23.8% Italian-American)
- Jersey City, particularly The Village
- Kearny
- Manalapan
- Margate
- Neptune City
- Newark
  - Ironbound, in the Italian Down Neck section. However, it has become less populated by Italian Americans since the 1970s.
  - Seventh Avenue
- Orange
- Long Hill
- Paramus
- Paterson
  - Little Italy

Paterson used to have the largest Italian percentage of any NJ city.

- Rockaway
- Rutherford
- Sea Isle City
  - Fish Alley
- Secaucus
- Toms River (22.6% Italian American)
- Trenton
  - South Trenton
    - Chambersburg
- Ventnor City (22.8% Italian American)
- Verona
- Vineland (22.8% Italian American)
- West New York
- Wildwood and The Wildwoods

== New York ==
The state of New York has the largest population of Italian Americans, at 3.1 million people. The majority of Italian Americans in New York City originated from southern parts of Italy.

=== New York City ===
New York City is home to the largest Italian-American population in North America and third largest Italian population outside of Italy, according to the 2000 census. See also Italians in New York City for more info.

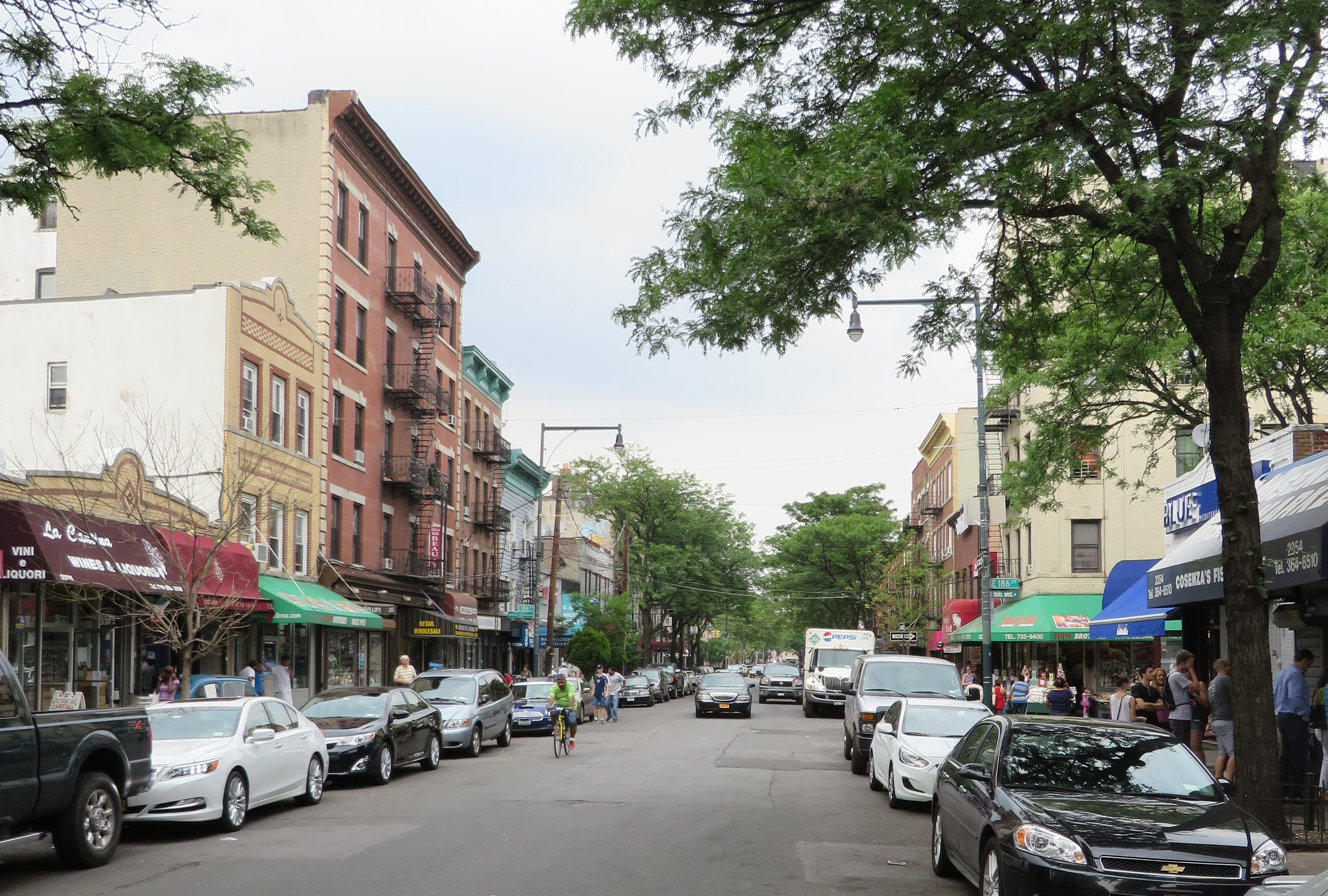
Arthur Avenue in the Bronx

- The Bronx
  - Arthur Avenue (Little Italy of the Bronx, and also the largest Little Italy in New York City)
  - Belmont
  - East Bronx
  - Morris Park
  - Pelham Bay
  - Throggs Neck
  - Country Club
- Brooklyn
  - Bath Beach
  - Bensonhurst (Little Italy of Brooklyn)
  - Bergen Beach
  - Bushwick
  - Carroll Gardens
  - Cobble Hill
  - Dyker Heights
  - Gravesend
  - Sections of Canarsie
  - Sections of Coney Island
  - Sections of Manhattan Beach
  - Sections of Marine Park
  - Sections of Mill Basin
  - Sections of Red Hook and Gowanus
  - Sections of Sheepshead Bay
  - Sections of Williamsburg
  - Historical South Brooklyn, especially in the parts of Cobble Hill, South Slope, and Boeurm Hill.
  - Historically and still currently to a lesser extent, significant populations in parts of Greenpoint, East New York, Bay Ridge, Ocean Hill, Brownsville, Flatbush, and East Flatbush
- Manhattan
  - Italian Harlem – now predominantly Hispanic and African-American and known as "Spanish Harlem"
    - Pleasant Avenue
  - Little Italy
    - Mulberry Street
  - Historically, there have also been significant populations in much of the Lower East Side, sections of Greenwich Village (especially south of Washington Square Park), and sections of Hell's Kitchen.
- Queens
  - Astoria
  - Corona Heights
  - Forest Hills
  - Howard Beach (Little Italy of Queens)
  - Ozone Park
  - Middle Village
  - Whitestone
  - Ridgewood
  - Sections of Rockaway Beach
- Staten Island – The borough has the highest proportion of Italian Americans of any county in the United States and North America. Over 200,000 residents claim Italian heritage (55%).
  - Annadale
  - Bulls Head
  - Concord
  - Dongan Hills (Little Italy of Staten Island)
  - Eltingville
  - Grasmere
  - Great Kills
  - Huguenot
  - Midland Beach
  - New Dorp
  - New Springville
  - Old Town
  - Pleasant Plains
  - Prince's Bay
  - Richmond Valley
  - Richmondtown
  - Rosebank
  - St. George
  - South Beach
  - Todt Hill
  - Tottenville
  - Westerleigh

=== Long Island ===
Long Island has a large Italian-American population.

- Nassau County
  - Bellerose
  - Bellmore
  - Bethpage
  - Carle Place
  - East Rockaway
  - Farmingdale
  - Floral Park
  - Franklin Square
  - Glen Cove
  - Hempstead
  - Inwood
  - Levittown
  - Long Beach
  - Lynbrook
  - Massapequa
  - Massapequa Park (45% Italian-American)
  - Mineola
  - New Hyde Park
  - North Massapequa (47% Italian-American)
  - Oceanside
  - Seaford
  - Valley Stream
  - Westbury
- Suffolk County
  - Bridgehampton
  - Deer Park
  - Greenport
  - Huntington
  - Lindenhurst
  - Mastic Beach
  - North Babylon
  - Selden
  - Smithtown
  - West Babylon
  - West Islip
  - Western Fire Island.

=== Westchester County ===
- Eastchester 40% Italian
- Tuckahoe
- Harrison
  - Downtown Harrison
  - West Harrison (also known as East White Plains)
- Mount Pleasant
  - Hawthorne
  - Thornwood
  - Valhalla
- Mamaroneck
  - Harbor Heights
- Mount Vernon
  - North Side
- New Rochelle
  - Downtown New Rochelle
- White Plains
- Yonkers
  - Nepperhan
  - Bryn Mawr
  - Dunwoodie
- Port Chester
  - Southwest near I-287
  - Northeast near Rye Brook
- Yorktown
  - Yorktown Heights

Yorktown in Westchester County has the annual feast of San Gennaro.

=== Rockland County ===
- Congers
- Sections of New City
- Sections of Nyack

=== Upstate, Central, and Western New York ===
- Albany – the South End neighborhood
- Amsterdam
- Auburn
- Binghamton
- Buffalo – the city's north side; however, they are scattered all across Buffalo, including a once high concentration on the city's West Side
- Canajoharie
- Canandaigua
- Canastota
- Carmel
- Chili
- Cicero
- Cortland
- Endicott – The north side of the village is Little Italy.
- Frankfort
- Fulton
- Gates – Little Italy of Rochester
- Geneva
- Gloversville
- Greece
- Herkimer
- Jamestown
- Kenmore
- Kingston
- Lockport
- Lyncourt
- Mahopac
- Middletown
- Monroe
- Newburgh
- Niagara Falls
- North Syracuse
- Oswego
- Poughkeepsie – primarily the Mount Carmel District
- Rochester – see History of Italians in Rochester, New York
- Rome – 30.2% Italian-American
- Rotterdam
- Schenectady
- Solvay
- Syracuse
  - Eastwood
  - Little Italy – on the city's North Side
- Troy – Hillary Clinton has proposed a "Little Italy" section in the city.
- Utica – 28% Italian-American, concentrated in East Utica
- Watertown

== North Carolina ==
- Valdese, Burke County
- Charlotte
- Raleigh
- Asheville

== Ohio ==
- Bellevue
- Chesterland
- Cleveland:
  - Collinwood
  - Little Italy
- Highland Heights
- Lowellville
- Mayfield Heights
- Mayfield Village
- Niles
- Sandusky
  - Perkins Township
- Poland
- South Euclid
- Steubenville
- Struthers
- Toledo
- Wickliffe
- Youngstown
  - Brier Hill

== Oklahoma ==
- Krebs, Oklahoma
- McAlester in historic Choctaw Nation.
- Muskogee

== Oregon ==
- Portland once had a "Little Italy" neighborhood.

== Pennsylvania ==
- Sections of Aliquippa
- Sections of Altoona – Little Italy and Gospel Hill
- Sections of Ambler
- Sections of Ambridge
- Sections of Arnold
- Sections of Bangor
- Sections of Braddock
- Sections of Bridgeville
- Sections of Brockway
- Sections of Canonsburg – birthplace of singer Perry Como.
- Sections of Clairton
- Sections of Clifton Heights
- Sections of Coatesville
- Sections of Collingdale
- Sections of Conshohocken
- Sections of Coraopolis
- Sections of Darby
- Sections of Downingtown
- Sections of Drexel Hill
- Sections of Dunmore
- Sections of Easton
- Ellwood City
- Erie
- Farrell
- Sections of Folcroft
- Sections of Glenolden
- Harmony Township
- Sections of Hazleton
- Homewood
- Hopewell Township
- Jessup
- Kennedy Township
- Koppel
- Sections of Lansdale/North Wales in the North Penn Valley
- Midland
- New Castle (Mahoningtown)
- New Galilee
- New Kensington
- Sections of Norristown
- Old Forge – 34% of the population
- Penn Hills Township
- Philadelphia – home to the second-largest Italian-American population in the United States, according to the 2000 census
  - Overbrook/West Philadelphia
  - South Philadelphia – largely Italian
    - Bella Vista
    - Central South Philadelphia
    - Girard Estate
    - Italian Market
    - Marconi Plaza
    - Packer Park
    - Passyunk West
    - St. Richard
    - Whitman
  - Areas of Kensington
  - Sections of Northeast Philadelphia
    - Mayfair
    - Tacony
  - Sections of Southwest Philadelphia
  - Areas of West Kensington
- Pittsburgh
  - Bloomfield
  - Larimer
- Sections of Pittston
- Sections of the Poconos region.
- Rankin
- Sections of Ridley Township
- Roseto – 41.8% of the population
- Sections of Scranton
- Sewickley
- Sharpsburg
- Stowe Township
- Sections of Upland
- Sections of Upper Darby Township
- Washington
- Sections of Wilkes-Barre

== Rhode Island ==
19% of Rhode Island residents are Italian American, the greatest percentage of any state. 199,180 of Rhode Island's population of 1,048,319 claim Italian ancestry.

- Barrington
- Bristol
- Cranston (25% Italian American)
- Johnston (53% Italian American)
- North Providence (43% Italian American)
- Providence:
  - Charles - Traditionally
  - Federal Hill (Little Italy of Providence)
  - Silver Lake - Traditionally
- Warwick
- West Warwick
- Westerly (34% Italian American)

== Texas ==
- Greater Houston
  - Galveston
- Bryan
- Dallas-Fort Worth Metroplex
  - Highland Park
  - Plano

== Utah ==
- Utah Italians – an article about Italian Americans in Utah, including converts to Mormonism, Waldenses from Lombardy and Italo-Protestants. The state's largest concentration in Sugarhouse district, Salt Lake City facing nearby South Salt Lake. 19th century Italian immigration in Ogden-Weber County.

== Washington ==
- Seattle Once had an Italian enclave that was referred to as “Garlic Gulch”
- Tacoma

== West Virginia ==
Approximately 11% of the combined population of "Mountaineer Country", collectively the north central West Virginia cities of Clarksburg, Fairmont and Morgantown, claim Italian ancestry, mostly from Italian immigrants recruited to work in mining and glass manufacturing.

- Clarksburg
- Fairmont
- Follansbee
- Morgantown
- Weirton

== Wisconsin ==
- Greenbush neighborhood of Madison – historically heavily Italian, but older Italians are dying off and younger ones have moved to the suburbs
- Historic Third Ward, Milwaukee
- Cable and other small towns in northern Wisconsin
- Racine
- Kenosha has the largest Italian community in the state.
