= Modern Apizza =

Coordinates: 41.313756°N 72.912732°W

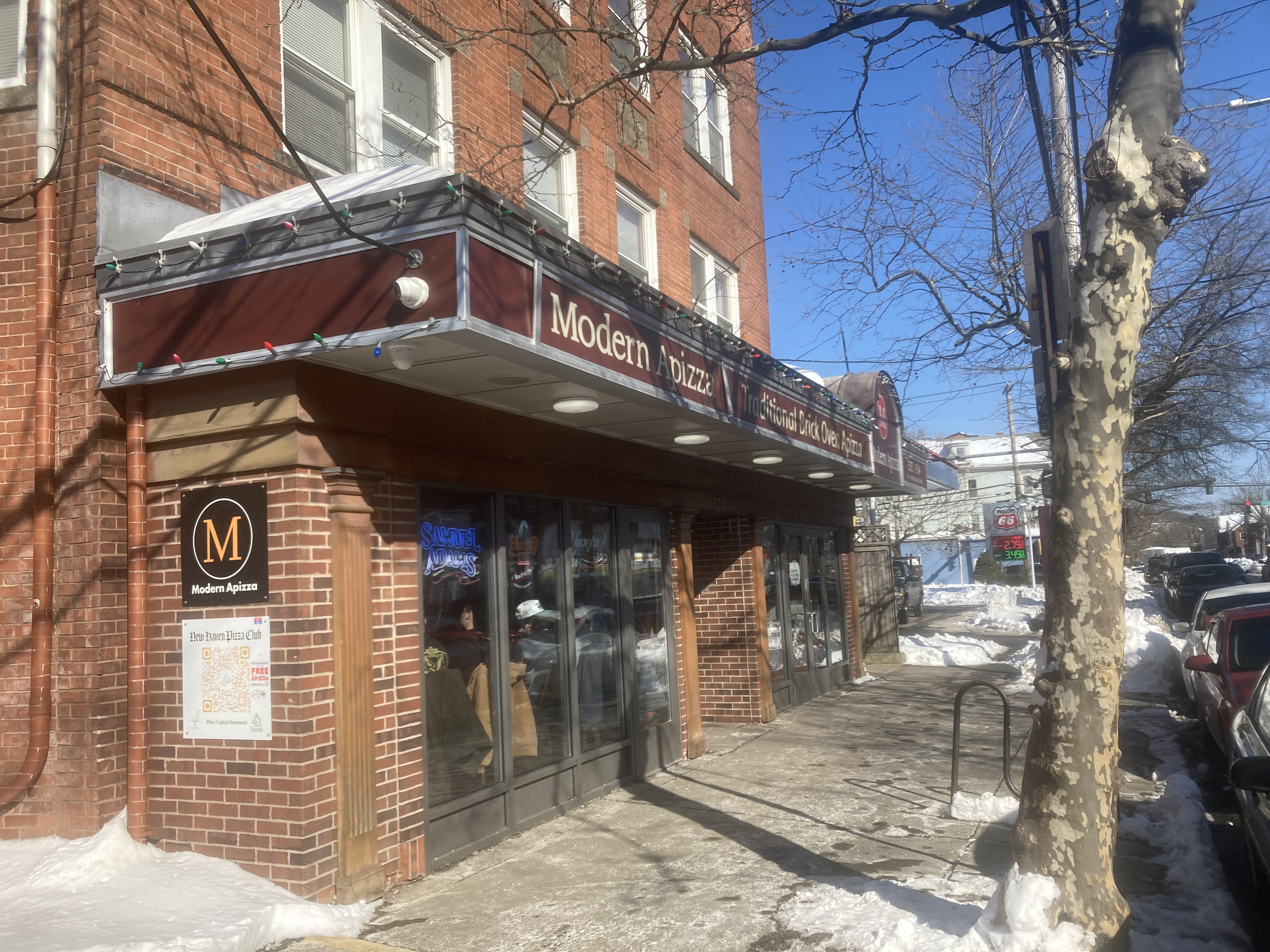
- Modern Apizza in 2026
- Interactive map of Modern Apizza

Restaurant information
- Established: 1934; 92 years ago (as State Street Apizza)
- Owners: Bill and Barbara Pustari
- Food type: New Haven-style pizza
- Dress code: Casual
- Location: 874 State Street, New Haven, Connecticut, 06511-3925, United States
- Reservations: Not taken
- Website: www.modernapizza.com

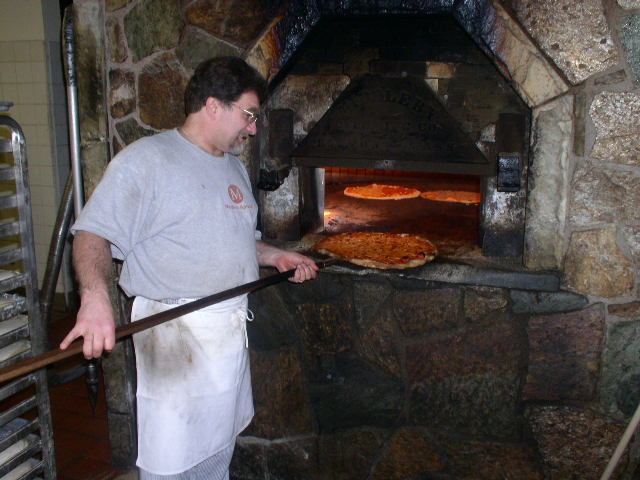
Modern Apizza's brick oven

Modern Apizza is an American pizza restaurant in New Haven, Connecticut. Along with Frank Pepe Pizzeria Napoletana and Sally's Apizza, Modern forms what is informally referred to by locals as the "Holy Trinity" of New Haven-style pizza; the three pizza parlors are consistently ranked by food critics as some of the best pizza places in the world.

== History ==
Originally called State Street Apizza, Modern Apizza was founded in 1934 and has been in the same location ever since. Unlike Frank Pepe Pizzeria Napoletana and Sally's Apizza, the other well-known New Haven pizzerias, Modern Apizza is not located on New Haven's famous Wooster Street but rather on nearby State Street in the East Rock neighborhood. In 2011, the restaurant was visited by Adam Richman on the first episode of the Travel Channel show Man v. Food Nation.

== Specialties ==
Like the Wooster Street pizzerias, Modern serves New Haven-style thin-crust apizza (closely related to Neapolitan-style Italian pizza). Unlike the Wooster Street pizzerias which use coal-fired brick ovens, Modern uses an oil-fueled brick oven. The restaurant also sells Foxon Park soft drinks, made in East Haven, Connecticut, which many locals argue are the perfect beverages to accompany New Haven-style pizza. Modern's specialties include the Clams Casino (Clams, Bacon & Peppers) the Italian Bomb (Sausage, Bacon, Pepperoni, Mushroom, Onion, Pepper & Garlic) and a classic Italian variation: Pizza Margherita, made with fresh mozzarella from Liuzzi Cheese in North Haven, Connecticut. Modern Apizza also uses fresh littleneck clams for their white clam pies; the only difference between Modern and Pepe's is that Modern uses pre-shucked clams while Pepe's shuck their clams on location. Yet another coastal favorite is a white tuna pie.

== Awards and accolades ==
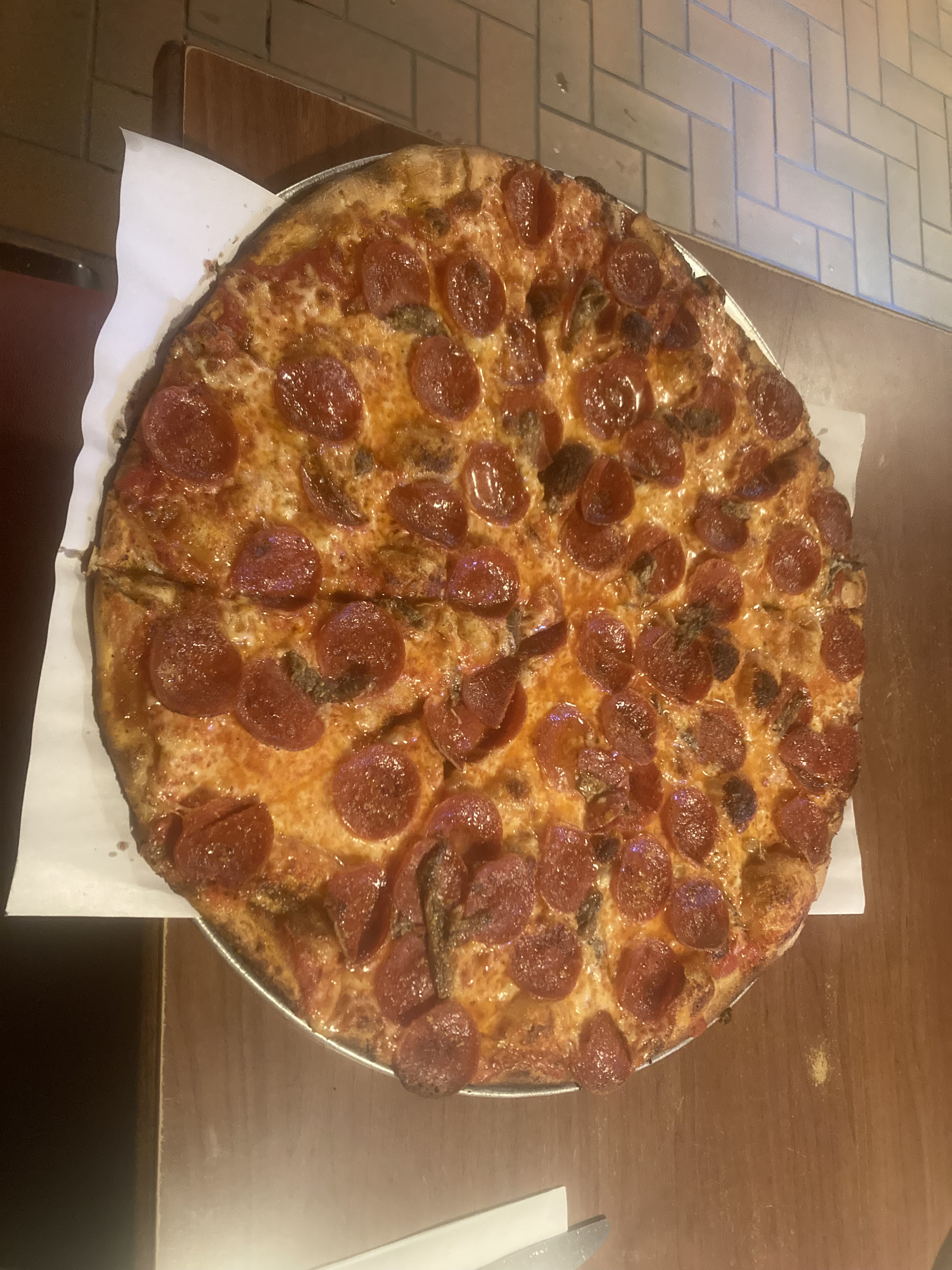
A pepperoni and anchovy pizza at Modern Apizza

In a blind taste test conducted by two Yale University undergraduates in 2008, Modern Apizza finished in first place ahead of five other New Haven pizzerias. It has also won the New Haven Advocate's Best of Reader's Poll for "Best Pizza" twelve years in a row. Playboy magazine named Modern Apizza as one of the ten best in the country. In 2017, The Daily Meal ranked Modern as one of the ten best pizza restaurants in the country, from a sampling of over 1,000 pizza restaurants by food critics and pizza experts. In 2023, Pizza Today magazine named Modern its 2023 Pizzeria of the Year.

== Documentary ==
Modern is one of three pizza restaurants featured in the documentary film Pizza A Love Story, directed by Gorman Bechard. The love story to New Haven's holy trinity of pizza restaurants, Pepe's, Sally's, and Modern, had its world premiere at Independent Film Festival Boston in April 2019. The film was released on DVD and pay-per-view on September 29, 2020. In reviewing the film, Deborah Brown of The Swellesley Report called it "An important film of staggering genius that needed to be made."

== Museum exhibit ==
Modern is also featured in an exhibit at the New Haven Museum called Pronounced Ah-Beetz which celebrates the history of New Haven apizza. The exhibit, which opened on October 9, 2025 and will be on display until October 2027, features the history of New Haven's three iconic Pizza restaurants: Frank Pepe Pizzeria Napoletana, Sally's Apizza, and Modern Apizza, as well as other beloved pizza restaurants throughout the New Haven area. Co-curated by Gorman Bechard, Jason Bischoff-Wurstle, Dean Falcone, and Colin M. Caplan, the idea grew out of Bechard's documentary Pizza: A Love Story and his visiting the now-shuttered Pizza Museum in Chicago. He felt a pizza museum belonged in New Haven. It was made possible by the connections the filmmaker and his producing team of Falcone and Caplan had made with the families of local pizza restaurants during the making of the documentary. Numerous holy grails of pizza history are on display, including the oldest known pizza box from 1936, Frank Pepe's original baking hat, and pizza boxes signed by Yogi Berra and Gwyneth Paltrow.
