= Frank Pepe Pizzeria Napoletana =

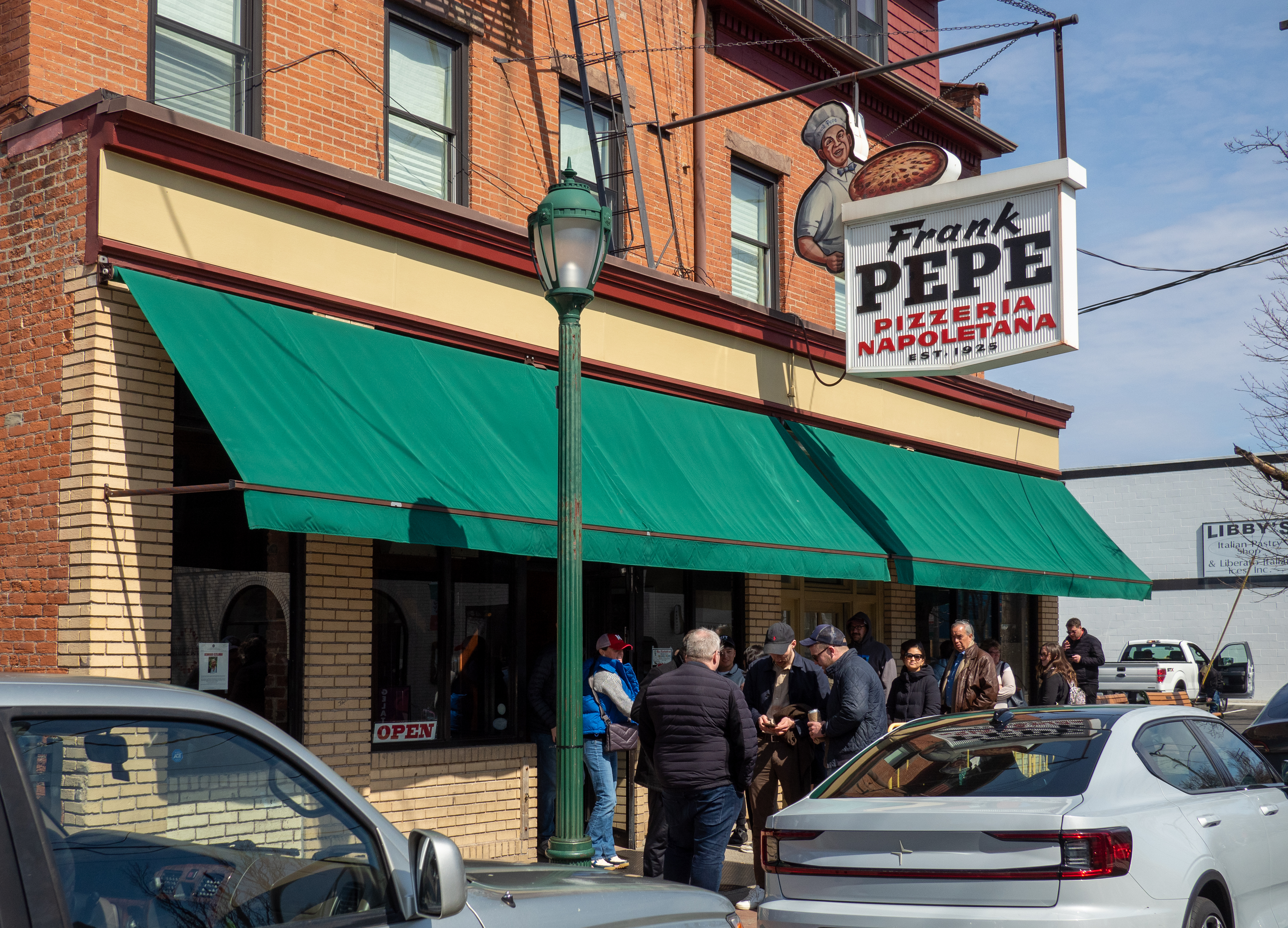
- Frank Pepe on Wooster Street in New Haven
- Interactive map of Frank Pepe Pizzeria Napoletana

Restaurant information
- Established: June 16, 1925; 101 years ago
- Owner: Frank Pepe's Grandchildren
- Food type: New Haven-style pizza
- Dress code: Casual
- Location: 157 & 163 Wooster Street (main locations), New Haven, Connecticut, 06511-5709, United States
- Coordinates: 41°18′10″N 72°55′01″W
- Seating capacity: 147 at Main Building, 69 at The Spot
- Reservations: Not taken at main locations, taken at some other locations.
- Website: PepesPizzeria.com

Frank Pepe Pizzeria Napoletana, commonly known as Frank Pepe's or simply Pepe's (/ˈpɛpiz/), is a New Haven style pizzeria chain based in Connecticut, with their flagship restaurant in the Wooster Square neighborhood of New Haven, Connecticut, at 163 Wooster Street and originator of New Haven-style pizza. Opened in 1925, it is one of the oldest and best known pizzerias in the United States. It has now expanded as a small, family-owned chain, with several other locations in Connecticut (8), Massachusetts (3), Rhode Island (1), New York City (1), Maryland (1), Florida (1), and Virginia (1).

== History ==
Frank Pepe (April 15, 1893 – September 6, 1969) was born in Maiori, Italy, and immigrated to New Haven in 1909 when he was a teenager. He worked alongside other Italian Immigrants in Wooster Square in local factories, such as Sargent & Co., a manufacturer of locks and hardware.

During World War I, Pepe returned to Italy to fight for his native country. He was honorably discharged from the Italian Army on February 25, 1919. On September 27, 1919, he married Filomena Volpi, who is also from Maiori, Italy. They left Italy for New York before Christmas 1919, and arrived in New York just after the new year in 1920.

After arriving in New York in 1920, the newly married Pepes returned to Wooster Square. Frank began working at a Wooster Street bakery. He was known for walking through the Wooster Square market selling his "tomato pies" off of a special headdress. After saving enough money, he was able to buy a wagon from which he sold his pizzas.

Pepe's continued success selling pizzas in the area convinced him and his wife to open their own restaurant. Frank and Filomena established "Frank Pepe Pizzeria Napoletana" on June 16, 1925, at 163 Wooster Street which is now known as "The Spot."

Pepe's originated the New Haven-style thin-crust apizza, closely related to Neapolitan-style Italian pizza, which he baked in a coal-fired brick pizza oven.

At first, Frank Pepe only made two varieties of pizza, and only offered two sizes. The "tomato pie" (tomatoes with grated pecorino romano cheese, garlic, oregano, and olive oil) and the other with the addition of anchovy. Because refrigeration was limited in the 1920s, Pepe's did not initially offer mozzarella cheese on their pizza.

The Boccamiello family initially owned the building at 163 Wooster Street. In the mid-1930s, they forced Frank Pepe out of the building. Soon after, they renamed the building "The Spot" and began selling their own pizzas out of the establishment.

Frank Pepe purchased the building next door to "The Spot" at 157 Wooster Street, He moved his restaurant to its current location next door in 1936. At that time, Frank Pepe Pizzeria Napoletana had the largest number of seats of any pizza restaurant in Wooster Square.

Pepe and his family lived in the apartments above the building and made the pizzeria the center of their entire lives. Frank (who was illiterate) was responsible for starting the fire for the coal-fired oven every morning, while Filomena handled the accounting and the business. Other family members were involved in the business, including Pepe's younger sister Rachel Colonna, daughters Elizabeth and Serafina, and son-in-law Ralph Rosselli.

Frank Pepe died in 1969. His two daughters took over the ownership and operation of the pizzeria. Like their parents, Elizabeth and Serafina made running the restaurant the center of their lives. They often brought their children to work with them, who would often take up the necessary tasks of operating a restaurant, such as dishwashing or cleaning the metal trays the pizzas are served on.

Elizabeth and Serafina bought back The Spot from the Boccamiello family in 1977. After renovating the building, the Pepe family re-opened "The Spot" back up to the public in 1981. "The Spot" serves the same menu as the location next door, and contains the original 1925 oven that Frank Pepe established his pizzeria with.

Pepe's daughters ran the daily operations of the pizzeria for decades before transferring ownership to their seven children, all of whom had experience working in various roles at the restaurant. Frank and Filomena's grandchildren are the current co-owners of restaurant, which began expanding in the 21st century.

Since opening a Fairfield, Connecticut location in 2006, Pepe's has expanded to seventeen locations in Connecticut, New York, Massachusetts, Rhode Island, Maryland, Virginia, and Florida.

Pepe's is one of three pizza restaurants featured in the documentary film Pizza A Love Story, directed by Gorman Bechard. The film had its world premiere at IFFBoston in April 2019. The film was released on DVD and pay-per-view on September 29, 2020.

Pepe's is also featured in an exhibit at the New Haven Museum called Pronounced Ah-Beetz which celebrates the history of New Haven apizza. The exhibit, which opened on October 9, 2025 and will be on display until October 2027, features the history of New Haven's three iconic Pizza restaurants: Frank Pepe Pizzeria Napoletana, Sally's Apizza, and Modern Apizza, as well as other pizza restaurants throughout the New Haven area. Frank Pepe's original baking hat is on display.

== Background ==
Pepe's is a major tourist attraction in New Haven.

=== Ovens ===
All Pepe's ovens are coal-fired and built in exactly the same manner from brick, based on the original. They measure 14 feet (4.3 m) by 14 feet (4.3 m) and cook pizzas in approximately 8 to 10 minutes. The oven bakes pizzas at 650 °F (343 °C), but the temperature of the coals can exceed 1,000 °F (538 °C).

Those who work the oven at Frank Pepe's are trained. According to Ralph Rosselli, husband of Elizabeth Pepe and pizzaiolo at the restaurant, “There are hot and cold spots in the oven. The heat isn’t uniform. You need experienced workers to rotate the pizzas so they cook properly."

=== Menu ===
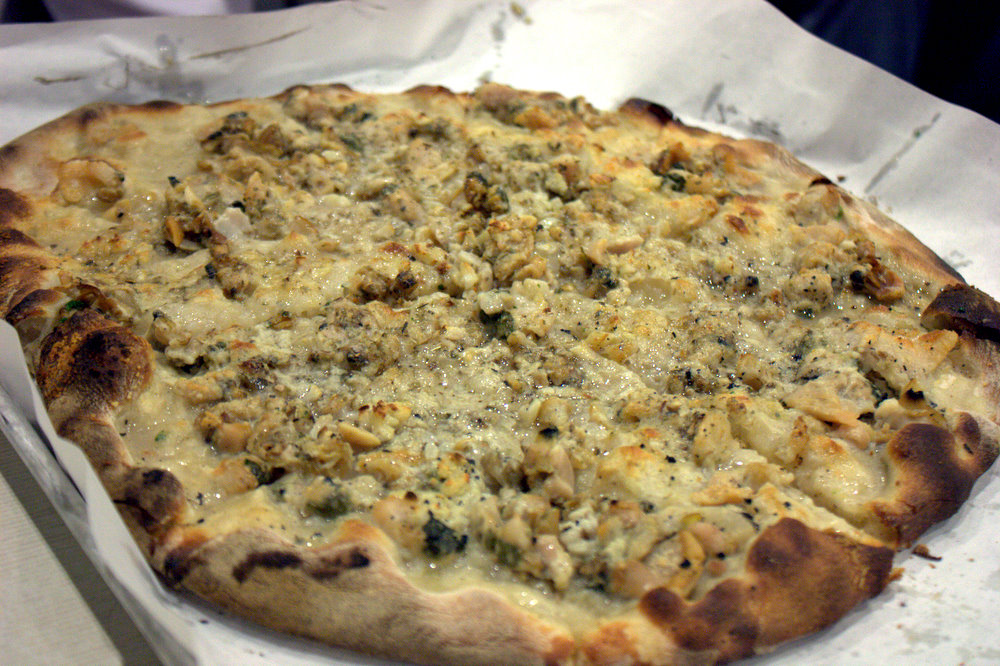
A white clam pie from Pepe's

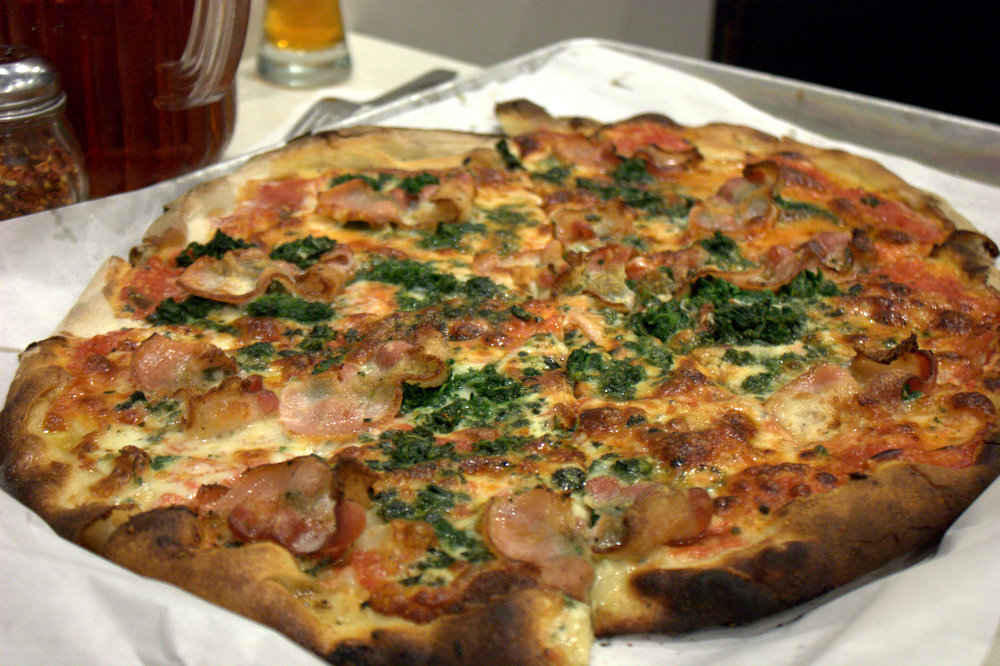
A red pie with bacon and spinach

All of Pepe's locations feature the same menu.

Since 1925, Pepe's has exclusively served Foxon Park bottled sodas from East Haven, Connecticut. The restaurant also offers fountain soda, beer, and wine. Since Pepe's established itself with a two-product menu (using ingredients that did not require refrigeration in 1925), mozzarella is considered a topping.

Boccamiello's nephew, Bear, would open clams and sell them on the half shell to passersby in the alleyway between The Spot and Pepe's.

Pepe's restaurant began serving littleneck clams on the half shell at the bar. Before long, Pepe decided to put the clams on the pizza. The white clam pie is olive oil, oregano, grated cheese, chopped garlic, and fresh littleneck clams. The restaurant will serve the pizza with or without mozzarella cheese, but they try to discourage customers from ordering it with mozzarella because they feel that it makes the pizza too heavy and rich.

Pizzamakers at Pepe's are adamant on using freshly shucked clams instead of canned clams; if fresh clams are not available, they will not serve the white clam pie. As of 2024, there is one worker who shucks all clams at the original location. He has been doing so since the 1990s.

Since its invention, the white clam pie has become the signature pizza of pizzerias in New Haven.

=== Locations ===
Pepe's has expanded outside of New Haven as a small family-owned chain. Frank Pepe's grandchildren are co-owners of the chain, including Francis Rosselli and formerly Gary Bimonte (1959–2021).

All locations feature the same green and white design of their building and fixtures, a replica of the coal-fired oven, serve on the square pizza pans, and use the same suppliers for their ingredients.

- Fairfield, CT (Opened March 2006)
- Manchester, CT (Opened September 2007)
- Uncasville, CT (Opened June 2009) inside Mohegan Sun
- Yonkers, NY (Opened in November 2009)
- Danbury, CT (Opened January 2011)
- West Hartford, CT (Opened September 2013)
- Chestnut Hill, MA (Opened December 2015)
- Waterbury, CT (Opened April 2017)
- Warwick, RI (Opened April 2018)
- Burlington, MA (Opened June 2019) at Burlington Mall
- Watertown, MA (Opened August 2020) at Arsenal Yards
- Bethesda, MD (Opened March 2022) at Westfield Montgomery
- Alexandria, VA (Opened July 2022)
- Delray Beach, FL (Opened June 2023)
- Stamford, CT (Opened June 2024)

Additionally, Frank Pepe Pizzeria Napoletana serves slices out of the Mohegan Sun Arena when there are events.

=== Competition ===
Frank Pepe Pizzeria Napoletana is also well known for its friendly rivalry with another Wooster Street pizza restaurant, Sally's Apizza. Sally's was founded by Pepe's nephew Sal Consiglio in 1938. The rivalry dates back decades and pizza fans are divided over which serves the better pizza. Frank Sinatra, for example, was a fan of Sally's, while Ronald Reagan preferred Pepe's. Several other celebrities that have declared their loyalty to Pepe's include: Paul Giamatti, Henry Winkler, Lyle Lovett, Steve Schirripa, Alex Guarnaschelli, David Chang, Bobby Flay, and others.

== Awards and Accolades ==
- 1999: Pepe's was named to the James Beard Foundation's list of "America's Classics".
- 2006: Pepe's is acknowledged on the History Channel's American Eats show as the originator of New Haven-style pizza in 1925.
- 2009: Pepe's was named the "Best Pizza on Earth" by The Guardian.
- 2009: Alan Richman, food correspondent for GQ magazine, names the tomato pizza at Pepe's the twelfth best pizza in the country in the May issue.
- 2009: Connecticut Magazine named Pepe's the best in the state.
- 2010: Frank Pepe Pizzeria Napoletana was inducted into that Connecticut Hospitality Hall of Fame on December 7, 2010.
- 2013: Zagat said that the white clam pizza at Pepe's was the best pizza in the state, in an article naming the best pizza in each state.
- 2013: The website The Daily Meal named the white clam pizza at Pepe's the best pizza in the country.
- 2014: The Daily Meal named the white clam pizza at Pepe's the best pizza in the country for the second year in a row.
- 2015: "America's Best Pizzas" by Food & Wine Magazine
- 2017: "Best Pizzerias in America" by Food Network
- 2018: "Best Pizza in the Northeast" by USA Today
- 2019: "The 101 Best Pizzas in America" by The Daily Meal
- 2020: "America's 25 Best Pizzerias" by The Daily Meal
- 2021: "America's 25 Best Pizzas" by The Daily Meal
- 2023: "Best Pizza Restaurants in the USA" by Gayot
- 2023: "28 Best Pizzas in the United States" by Food & Wine
- 2023: Yonkers, NY location added to the New York Michelin Guide

== See also ==
- List of Italian restaurants
- List of pizza chains of the United States
