= White clam pie =

Pizza variety

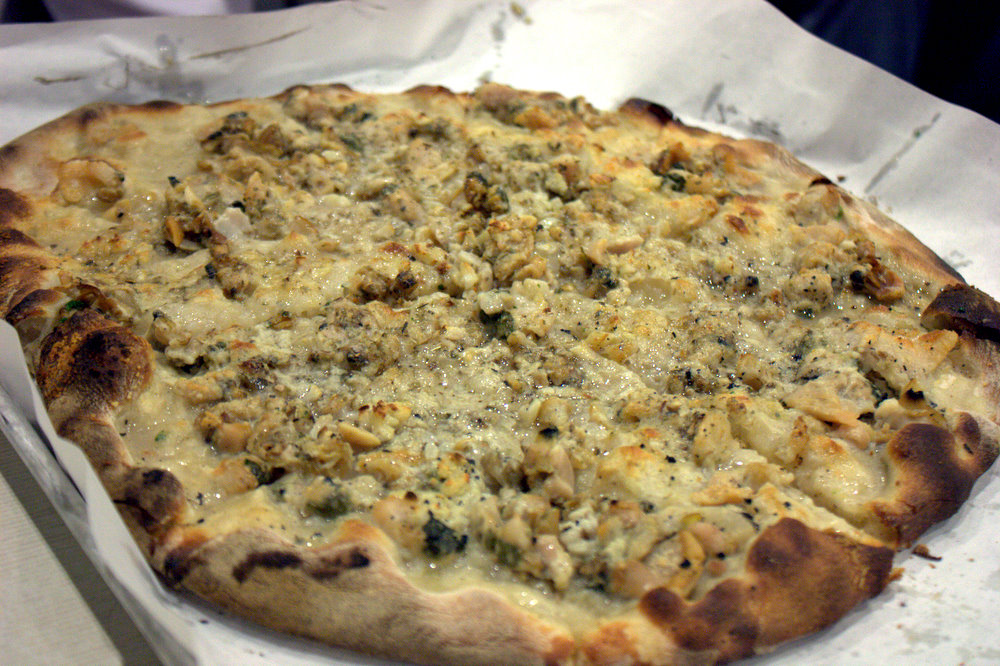
A clam pizza pie

White clam pie is a pizza variety that originated in New Haven, Connecticut. It is typically prepared using pizza dough, clams, olive oil, grated Romano cheese, garlic and oregano. Fresh or canned clams can be used, and the clams can be minced or whole.

The dish was first created at Frank Pepe Pizzeria Napoletana restaurant in the Wooster Square neighborhood of New Haven sometime in the 1950s.

Pepe's restaurant prepared a pizza of crust, olive oil, oregano, grated cheese, chopped garlic, and fresh littleneck clams. It first served littleneck clams on the half shell at the bar, which Pepe later added to the pizza.

It is now one of New Haven's two nationally famous pizza varieties, along with apizza.

== See also ==
- List of clam dishes
- List of pizza varieties by country
