= Sally's Apizza =

Restaurant in New Haven, Connecticut

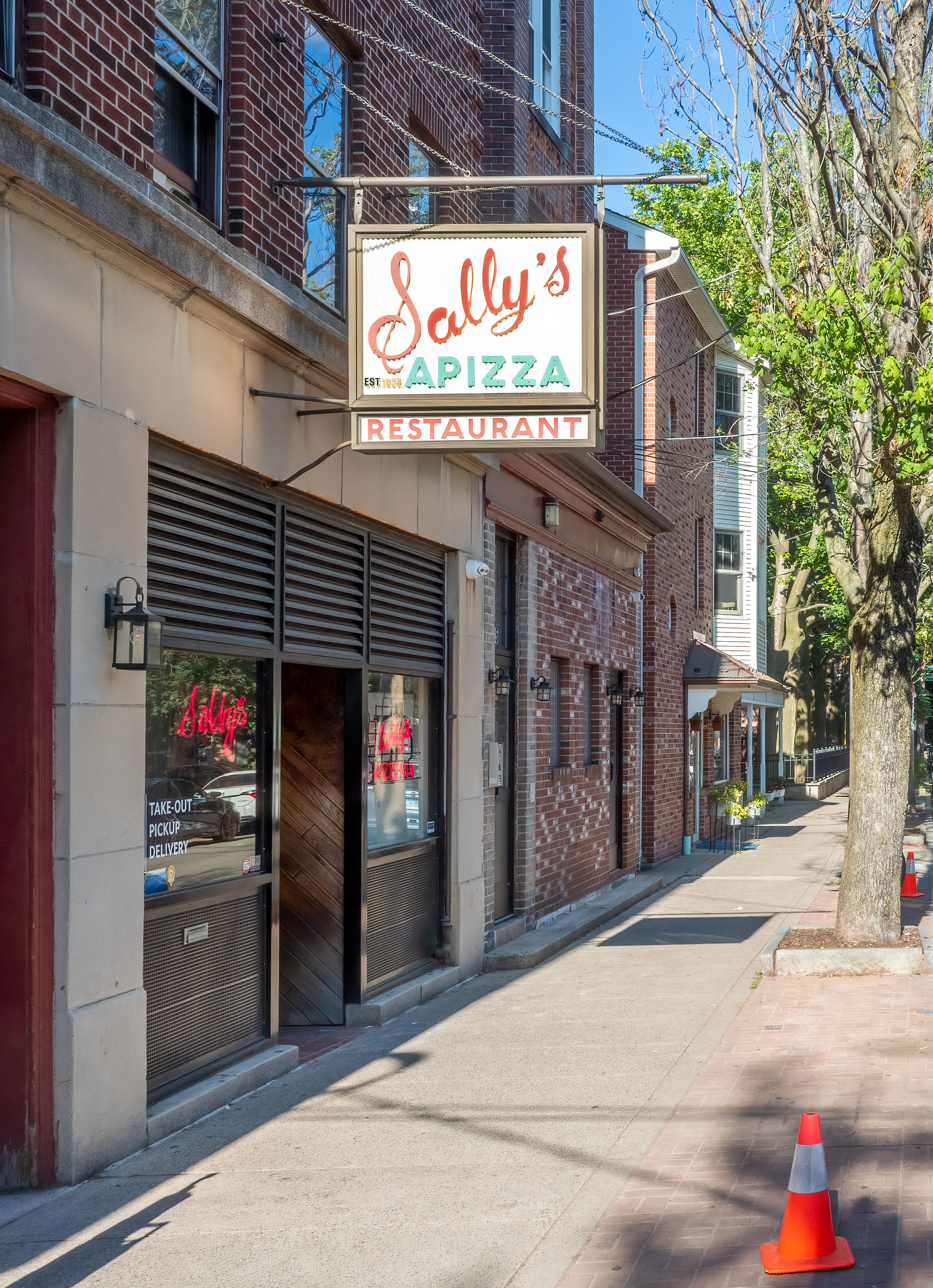
- Storefront on Wooster Street in New Haven
- Interactive map of Sally's Apizza

Restaurant information
- Established: April 1938; 88 years ago
- Owner: Lineage Properties LLC
- Food type: New Haven-style pizza
- Dress code: Casual
- Location: 237 Wooster Street, New Haven, Connecticut, 06511, United States
- Coordinates: 41°18′11″N 72°55′12″W
- Reservations: Not taken
- Website: SallysApizza.com

Sally's Apizza is a New Haven style pizzeria chain based in Connecticut, established in April 1938. Their flagship location is in the Wooster Square neighborhood of New Haven, Connecticut. Sally's Apizza also has locations in Stamford, Connecticut; Fairfield, Connecticut; Wethersfield, Connecticut; Farmington, Connecticut; Dorchester, Massachusetts and Woburn, Massachusetts.

== Fare ==
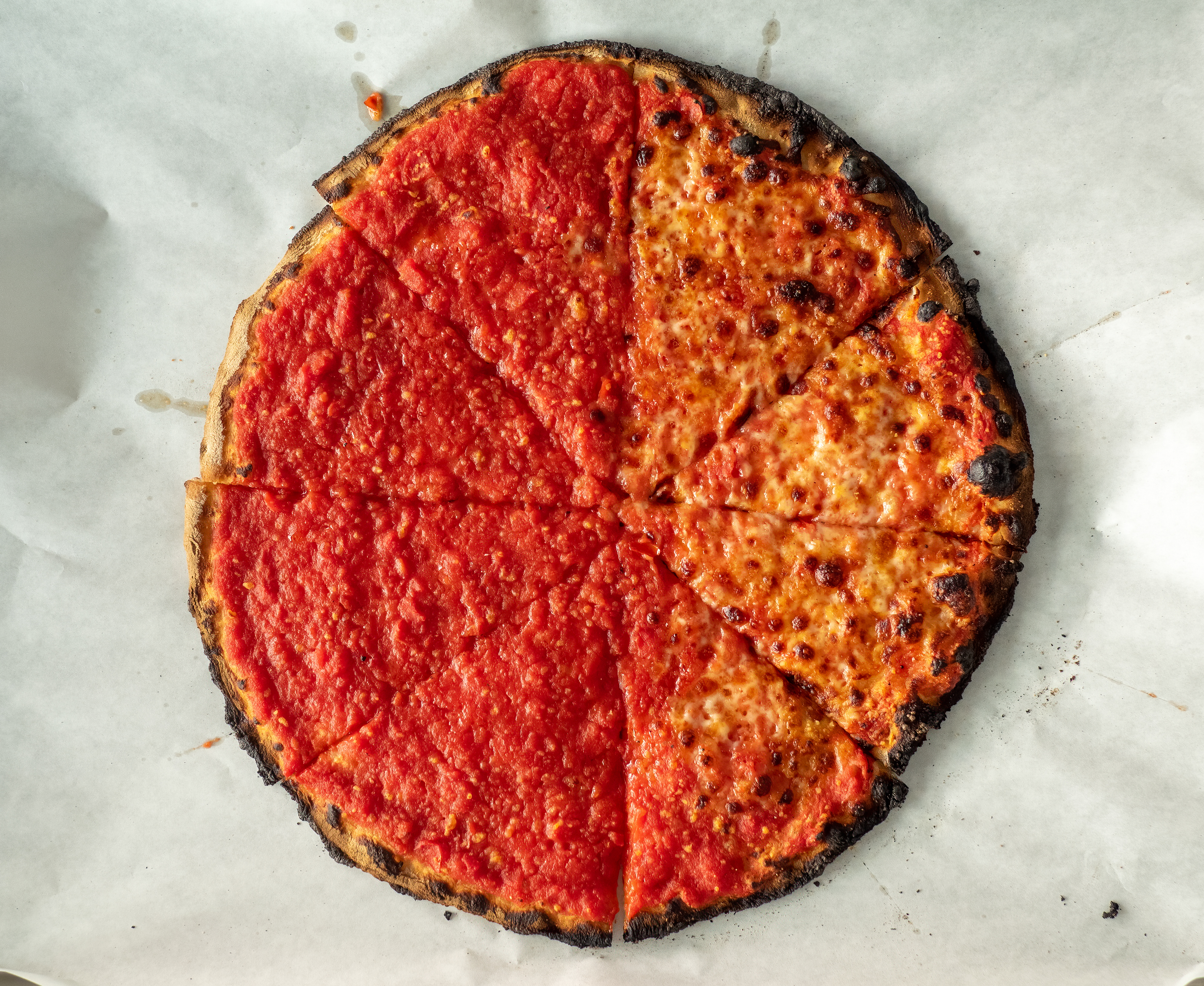
A half-tomato/half-mozzarella pizza at Sally's Apizza

Sally's serves New Haven-style thin-crust apizza, which is baked in coal-fired brick pizza ovens. Sally's is a small restaurant, and patrons must often wait in line, sometimes for hours.

== History ==
The restaurant was purchased for $500 in 1938 by Filomena Consiglio, sister of Frank Pepe, who was the owner of Frank Pepe Pizzeria Napoletana, another Wooster Street pizza restaurant. Sal Consiglio, a son of Filomena, ran it until his death in May 1989. His wife Flo died in September 2012. While their children Richard and Robert still operate the restaurant, they sold it to an unnamed buyer in 2017. In 2021, a second location was opened in Stamford, Connecticut. In 2022, a third location was opened in Fairfield, Connecticut. In December 2023, a fourth location was opened in Woburn, Massachusetts. Additional locations are planned in Connecticut and Massachusetts.

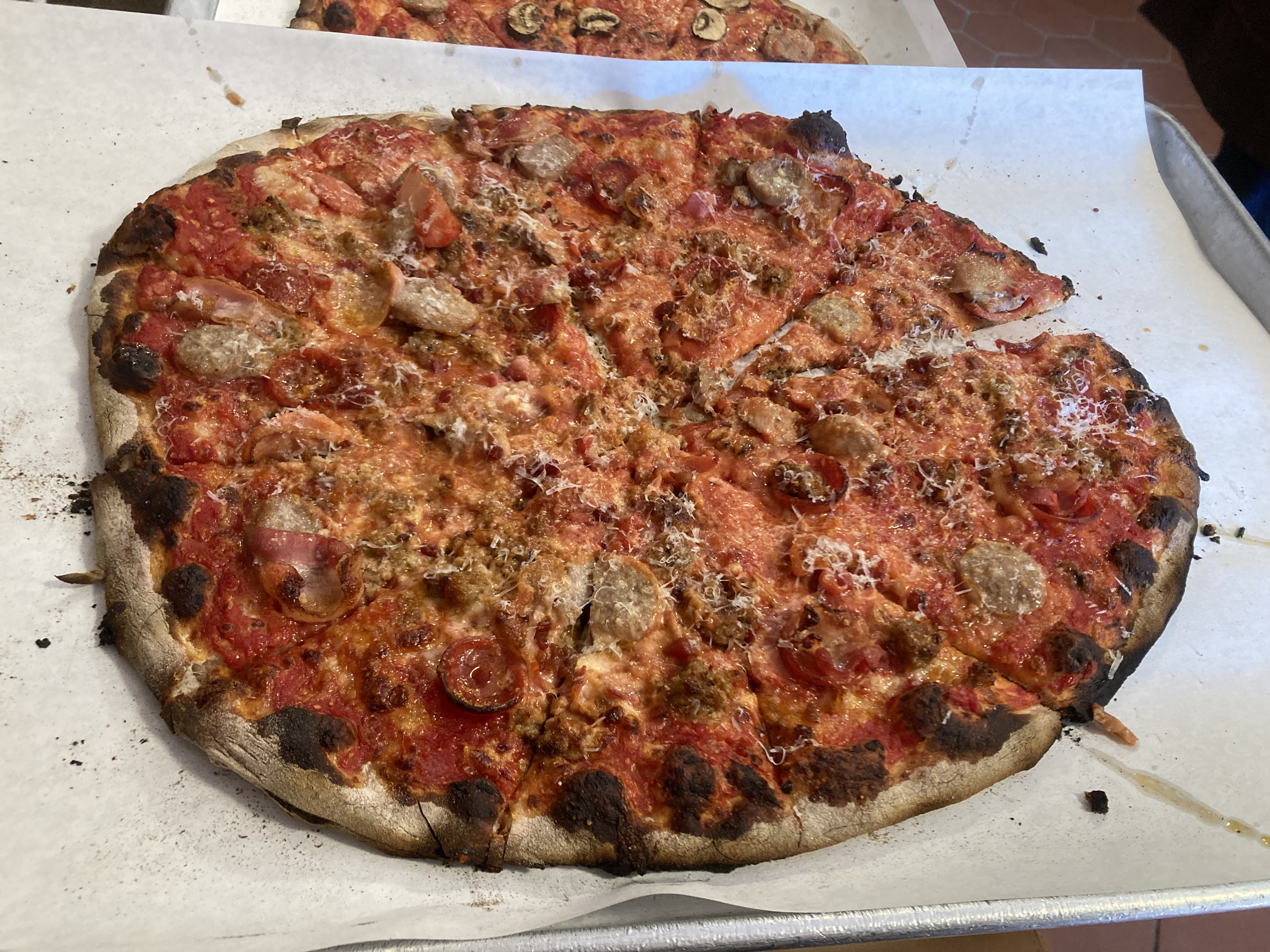
A Meats Apizza at Sally's Apizza

Sally's is one of three pizza restaurants featured in the documentary film Pizza: A Love Story, directed by Gorman Bechard. The love story to New Haven's holy trinity of pizza restaurants, Pepe's, Sally's, and Modern, had its world premiere at IFFBoston in April 2019. The film was released on DVD and pay-per-view on September 29, 2020. In reviewing the film, Deborah Brown of The Swellesley Report called it "An important film of staggering genius that needed to be made."

Sally's is also featured in an exhibit at the New Haven Museum called Pronounced Ah-Beetz which celebrates the history of New Haven apizza. The exhibit, which opened on October 9, 2025 and will be on display until October 2027, features the history of New Haven's three iconic Pizza restaurants: Frank Pepe Pizzeria Napoletana, Sally's Apizza, and Modern Apizza, as well as other beloved pizza restaurants throughout the New Haven area. Co-curated by Gorman Bechard, Jason Bischoff-Wurstle, Dean Falcone, and Colin M. Caplan, the idea grew out of Bechard's documentary Pizza: A Love Story and his visiting the now-shuttered Pizza Museum in Chicago. He felt a pizza museum belonged in New Haven. It was made possible by the connections the filmmaker and his producing team of Falcone and Caplan had made with the families of local pizza restaurants during the making of the documentary. Numerous holy grails of pizza history are on display, including the oldest known pizza box from 1936, Frank Pepe's original baking hat, and pizza boxes signed by Yogi Berra and Gwyneth Paltrow.

== See also ==
- List of Italian restaurants
