= Foxon Park =

Soft drink brand

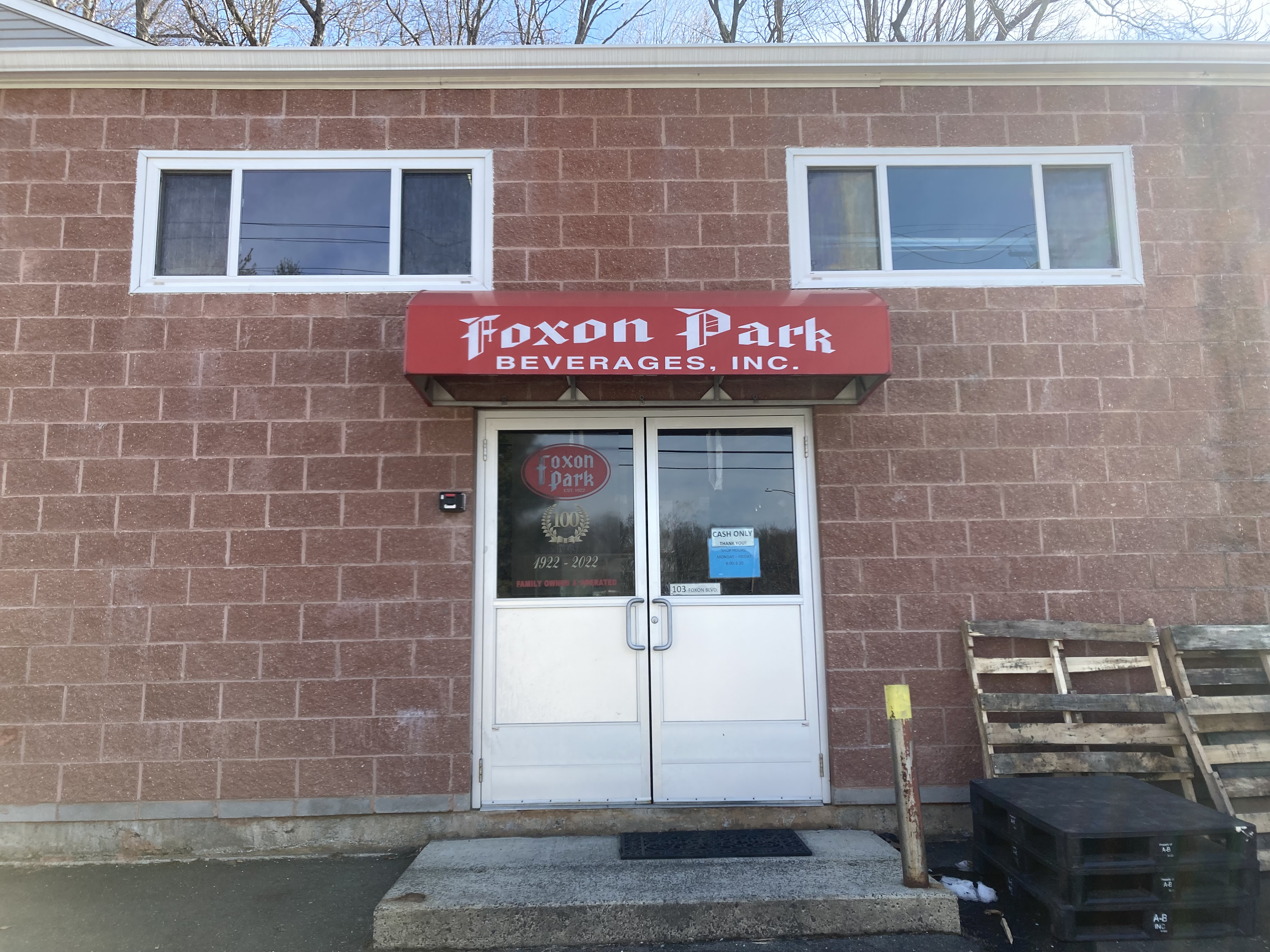
- Foxon Park's headquarters
- Industry: Soft drinks
- Founded: East Haven, Connecticut, Connecticut, USA (1922)
- Products: Birch beer Root beer Ginger ale Cream soda Kola; Orange; Grape; Cherry; Lemon-Lime; Gassosa; Strawberry; Iron brew Diet Birch Beer; Diet Kola; Diet Orange; Diet Gassosa; Sparkling water Tonic water
- Website: foxonpark.com

Foxon Park is a soft drink brand produced by Foxon Park Beverage Company. The company is located in East Haven, Connecticut. Their sodas are a traditional accompaniment to the New Haven-style pizza sold throughout the area. They are also served at Louis' Lunch. Flavors include: cream soda, white birch, grape, orange, ginger ale, kola, gassosa, lemon-lime, root beer, iron brew, strawberry, sparkling water, tonic water, and cherry. Foxon Park is noted for using natural ingredients as well as utilizing cane sugar as a sweetener, unlike most soft drinks which use high fructose corn syrup. Their slogan is "All-Ways in Good Taste."

== History ==
Foxon Park was founded in 1922 in East Haven, Connecticut by Matteo Naclerio, an immigrant from Italy. The beverage company Naclerio opened was named after the Foxon Park section of East Haven, and is still located at its original location on Foxon Blvd. The company began by bottling water and delivering it to homes in the area. When there was a downturn in demand for bottled water due to the Depression, the company began making and delivering soda in 1929. Some unique flavors were offered, such as Iron Brew (a drink made famous in Scotland) and gassosa (a lemon-flavored Italian soda). Foxon Park still remains a family-owned business.
