= Coal-fired pizza =

Pizza style in the United States

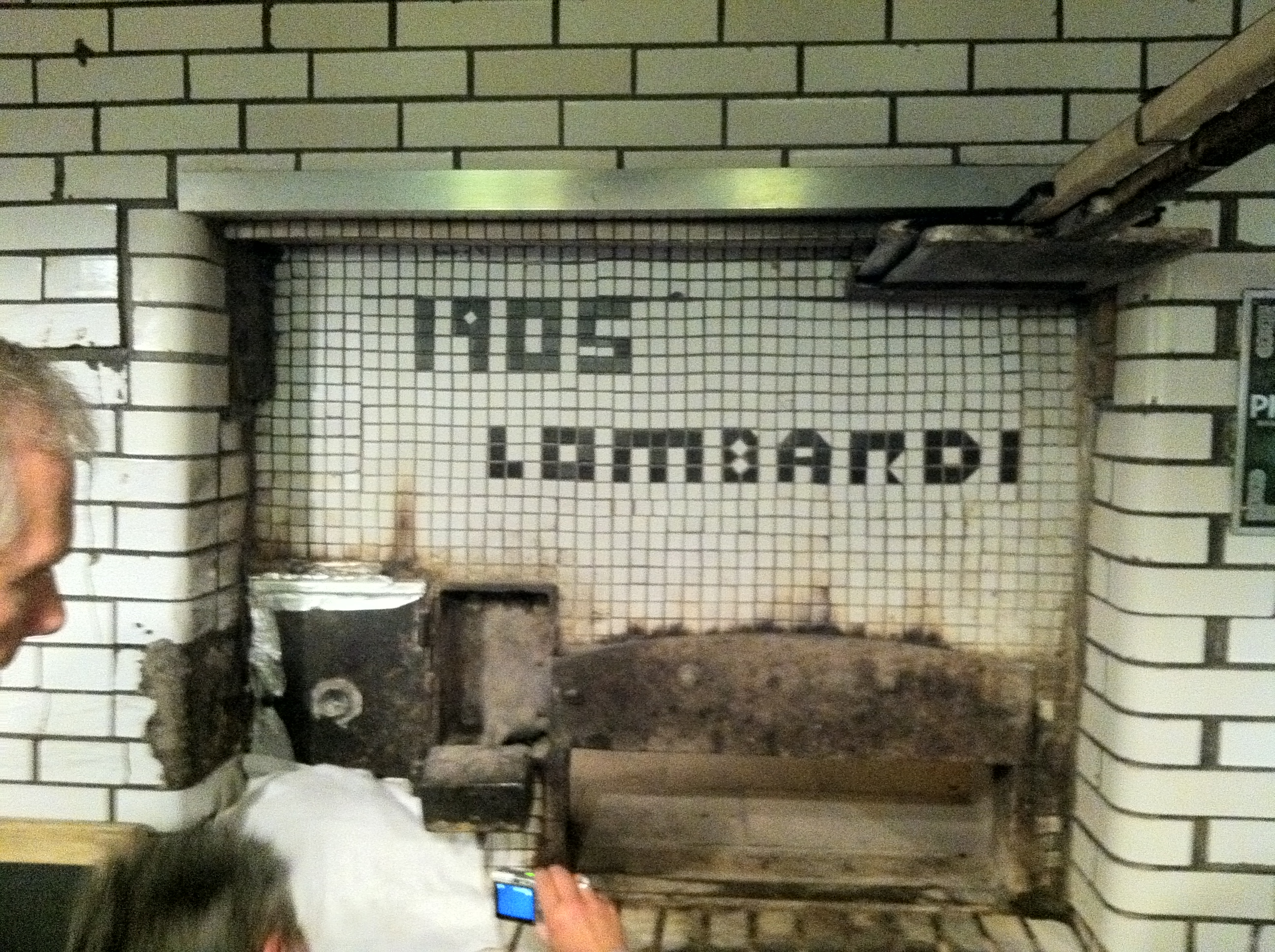
The coal-fired pizza oven at Lombardi's Pizza in Manhattan

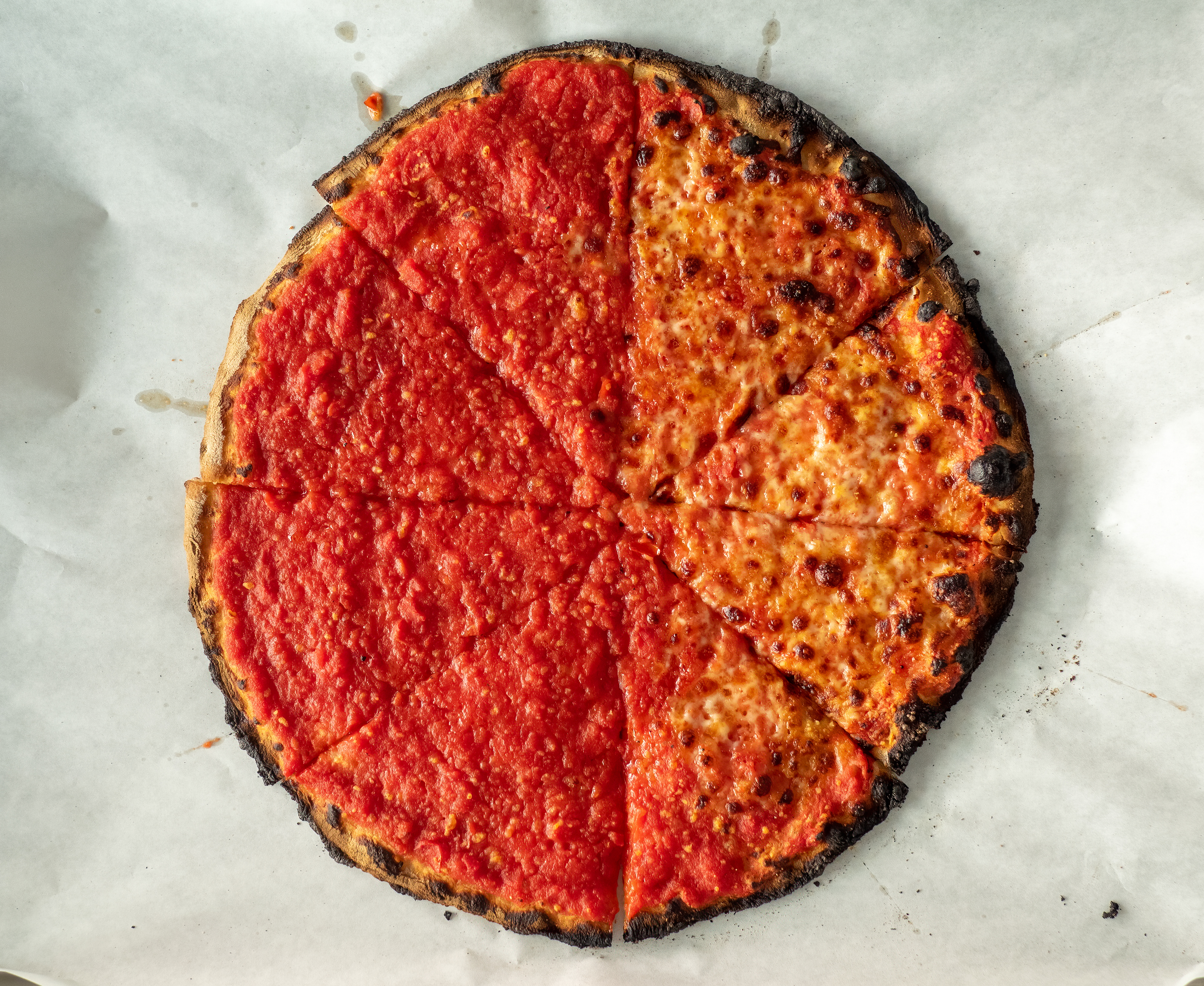
New Haven-style pizza cooked in a coal-fired oven at Sally's Apizza

Coal-fired pizza is a pizza style in the United States. New York–style pizza and New Haven–style pizza are often cooked in coal-fired pizza ovens. A coal-fired oven can reach 900 °F (482 °C) and cooks a pie in two to five minutes.

Pizzerias outside of the Northeastern United States that feature coal-fired ovens are uncommon enough to be noted in travel guides: for instance, Black Sheep Pizza with the first coal-fired oven in Minneapolis, or URBN in San Diego. As of 2007, coal-fired ovens were quite uncommon in the Western United States with only five others west of the Mississippi: four in an Arizona chain and one more in Las Vegas.

The growing popularity of coal-fired pizza in the 2010s was identified as a major market for anthracite coal suppliers, most of whom are in Pennsylvania's Coal Region and generally see a declining market due to demand for alternate industrial and home heating fuel sources.

== Health concerns ==
Concerns have been raised about particulates, sulfur dioxide and CO_{2} emissions from coal-fired pizza ovens.
