= History of Italians in Rochester, New York =

Between 1870 and 1920, thousands of Italians arrived in Rochester, forming close-knit enclaves around Lyell Avenue, Jay Street, and Paul Street. Paul Street being particularly popular to many of the first Italian immigrants to move to Rochester, and the land between street and the river north of Andrews Street became known as "Sleepy Hollow". Amid discrimination and industrial hardship, faith and food became the twin pillars of identity and resilience.

== History ==
After Italy unified in 1861, millions of citizens left because the country struggled with poverty, lack of land, and a failing rural economy. Between 1870 and 1914, over 16.6 million departures during fifty years occurred as farm wages dropped and small villages could no longer support growing families. Southern Italy was hit hardest; crop failures, low-paying farm jobs, and heavy taxes pushed people to search for "bread and work" elsewhere. As conditions worsened, families relied on migration networks, and entire communities began leaving in connected waves. By the 1890s, emigration had become a survival strategy for many Italian households.

Italian Imigration in Rochester

Many Italian immigrants chose Rochester because the city offered steady jobs, affordable housing, and well-established labor opportunities available nowhere else.

The first Italian immigrant in Rochester arrived in 1860, however his name was not recorded. By 1864, two more Italian families had arrived, however Domenico Sturla was the first Italian to be named in directories from the late 1860s.

By the 1880s and into the 1920s, Rochester's booming industries, such as construction, canal work, railroads, nurseries, quarries, and later the clothing and shoe factories, actively hired unskilled laborers, which matched the backgrounds of many southern Italian migrants. Word spread quickly through letters from relatives and paesani, forming the earliest chain-migration links to the city, as "men came first and sent for their families later". Rochester was also large enough to offer work yet small enough that immigrants could live close to their kin and maintain familiar village-style networks. These combined economic and social ties made Rochester a natural destination during the first major Italian migration wave.

The most prominent challenge for the Italian immigrants in relation to education was overcoming the language barrier that English presented. Many parents attempted to send their children to school and by 1910 there was a clear recognition of Italian children within American schools. Around this time, the Sisters of Sacred Heart opened an "Italian School" for children of Italian Immigrants. They hosted their first Italian School Alumni Day in 1920. It would continue for another five years, but was ultimately discontinued due to a lack of staff.

In 1934, Italian Day was celebrated on August 26 as part of Rochester's Centennial Exposition. The United Italian Civic League organized a program of Italian music performed by a chorus of over 250 along with the Civic Orchestra. Over 60,000 Italian-Americans attended. Antonio Grossardi, the Italian Consul General, also spoke at the event.

=== 1940s–1960s ===
By 1940, the Italian population in Rochester grew to 17.8%, doubling the 1910 census. At this time, there was little assimilation of Italians into American culture in Rochester, creating a large dichotomy between the communities. World War II brought about several changes globally and locally and as a growing city, Rochester saw its first dip in population during WWII. This, among other factors, led to the construction of the suburbs, which in turn, worked to integrate Italian culture into the framework of Greater Rochester.

After WWII, Rochester became a major destination for post-war Italian immigrants because of its booming men's clothing industry. Clothing companies like Michaels, Stern & Company, Stein, Bloch & Company, Fashion Park Clothes, Adler Bros., Bond's, Hickey Freeman, and Timely Clothes required skilled labor in which Italian Immigrants filled when Rochester's Congressman helped pass special legislation to help Italian immigrants gain

Throughout the 20th century, ethnic organizations such as the Order of the Sons of Italy, mutual-aid societies, the Italian American Sports Club, and other Italian social clubs fostered social cohesion and general assistance.

In 1965, Caltanissetta, a city in Sicily, was designated as a sister city of Rochester. In 2015, delegation from Caltanissetta, including the then-mayor, Giovanni Ruvolo, and city council president, Leyla Montagnino, visited Rochester for a seven-day celebration marking the 50th anniversary of the sister city agreement between the two cities.
