= Mount Carmel District =

Historic district in Poughkeepsie, New York, U.S.

A view of the Mount Carmel District from the Walkway Over the Hudson.

The Mount Carmel District (or Area) is a historic neighborhood in Poughkeepsie, New York named for Our Lady of Mount Carmel Church and its associated (now defunct) school.

== Location ==
The neighborhood is located on Poughkeepsie's north side. It roughly encompasses an area south of Marist College and just north of the Poughkeepsie Train Station. The neighborhood's western border is provided by U.S. Route 9.

== History and Culture ==
In 1910, Our Lady of Mount Carmel church opened on what is now Mount Carmel Place. Nearly 60 years later, the congregation moved into the former St. Peter's Church at 97 Mill Street. A parish school was established in 1935, closing in 2007 due to low enrollment. Two years later, the school building was reopened under the direction of Astor Services and now functions as a school for special-needs students. Astor Services also occupies the original Church building on Mount Carmel Place.

The area has been home to many of Poughkeepsie's new immigrant populations, starting with the Irish, later the Italians, and is currently experiencing an influx of Latino immigrants. Still home to several Italian restaurants and bakeries, the area is widely referred to as Poughkeepsie's Little Italy. Each June Our Lady of Mount Carmel Parish hosts the St. Anthony's Street Festival. This event draws a large number people to the District.

The historic Poughkeepsie Railroad Bridge runs directly over the District. The area has seen increased traffic since the bridge reopened as the Walkway Over the Hudson State Historic Park in October 2009.

== Notable Businesses ==
- Dalleo's Delicatessen
- La Deliziosa Pastry Shoppe
