= New Haven–style pizza =

Regional Pizza Style from New Haven, Connecticut

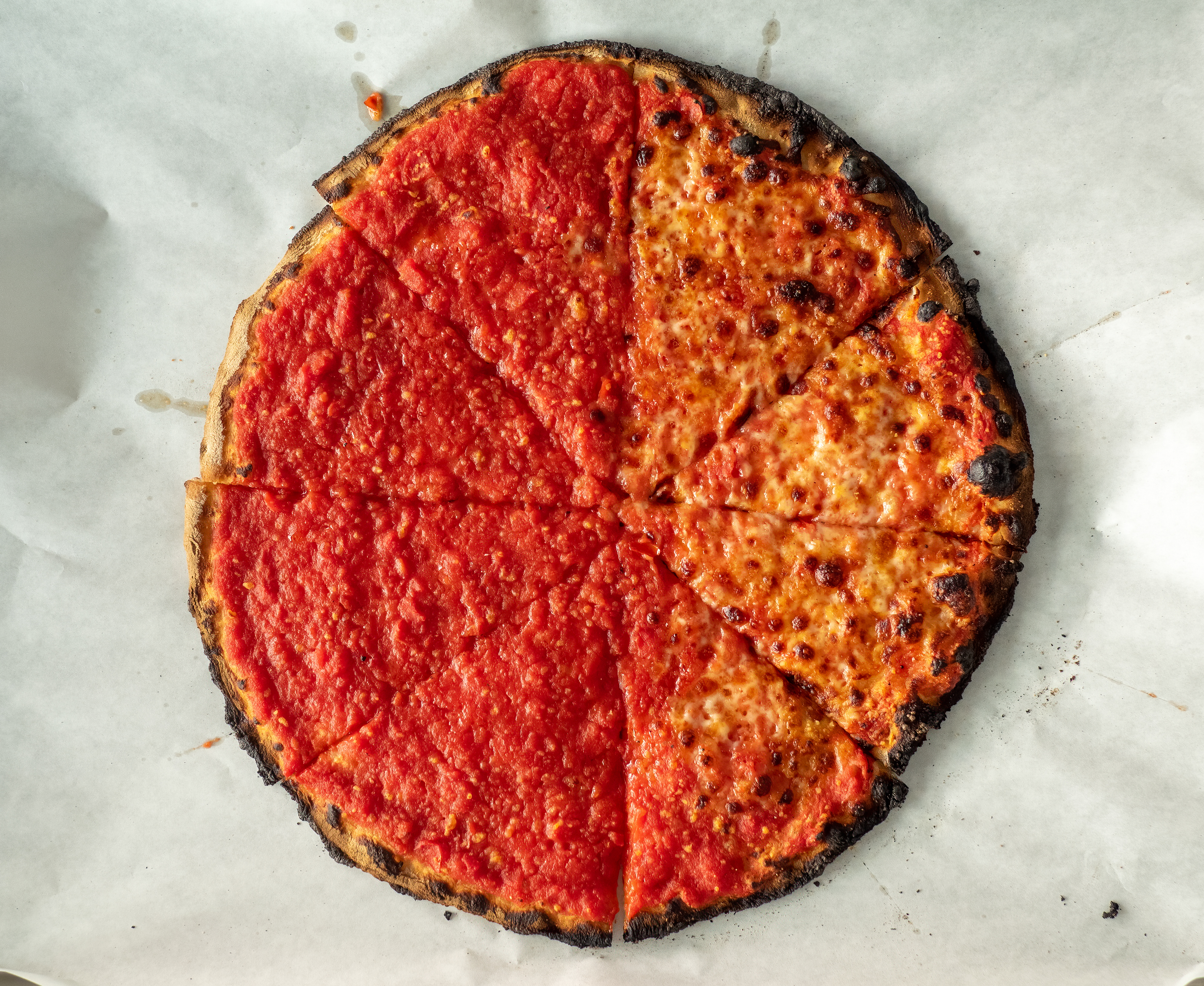
- A half-tomato/half-mozzarella apizza from Sally's Apizza in New Haven, Connecticut
- Alternative names: Apizza
- Type: Pizza
- Place of origin: United States
- Region or state: New Haven, Connecticut
- Created by: Frank Pepe Pizzeria Napoletana
- Main ingredients: Pizza dough, tomato sauce, pecorino romano

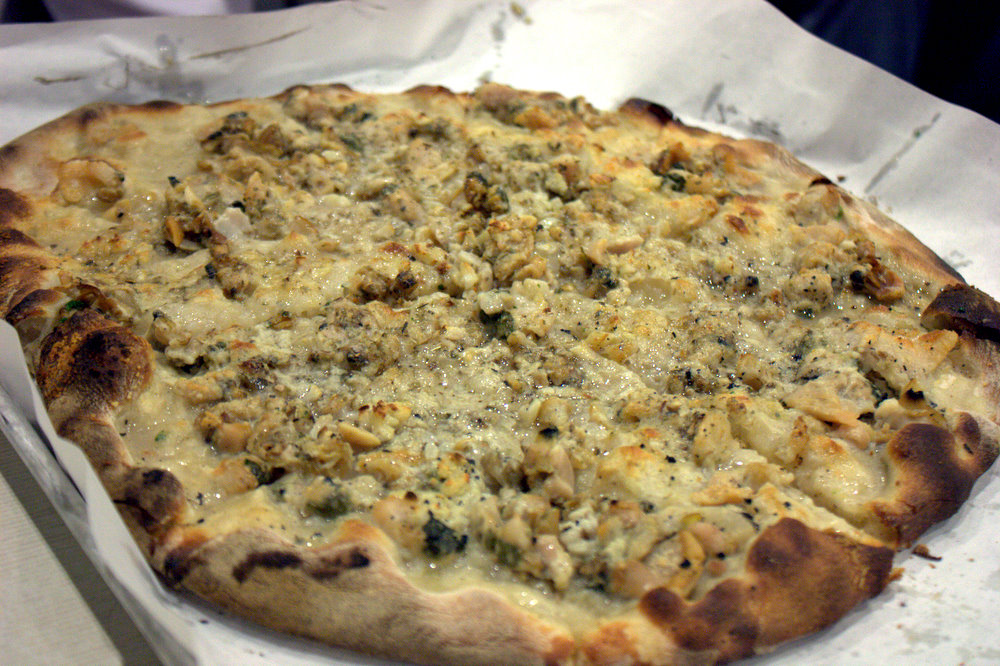
White clam apizza from Frank Pepe Pizzeria Napoletana in New Haven

New Haven–style pizza is a thin-crust, coal-fired Neapolitan pizza which is common in and around New Haven, Connecticut. Locally known as apizza (/əˈbiːts(ə)/; from Neapolitan 'a pizza [a ˈpittsə], lit. 'the pizza'), it originated in 1925 at the Frank Pepe Pizzeria Napoletana and is now served in many other pizza restaurants in the area, most notably Sally's Apizza and Modern Apizza. This pizza style has been favorably regarded by national critics.

What makes New Haven–style pizza distinct is its thin, often oblong crust, characteristic charring, chewy texture, and limited use of melting cheeses. It tends to be drier and thinner than, but closely related to, traditional New York–style pizza, both of which are close descendants of the original Neapolitan pizza.

== Classic types ==
In a New Haven–style pizzeria, a classic or "plain" pizza is a crust, oregano, tomato sauce, and a little bit of grated pecorino romano cheese. A New Haven–style pizza without extra toppings may also be called a "tomato pie". Mozzarella is considered an optional topping.

Pepe's restaurant is credited with inventing the white clam pie: a pizza of crust, olive oil, oregano, grated cheese, chopped garlic, and fresh littleneck clams. It first served littleneck clams on the half shell at the bar, which Pepe later added to the pizza.

== Baking and serving methods ==
New Haven–style pizza is traditionally baked in a coal-fired oven at extremely hot temperatures above 650 °F (343 °C). It is sold whole rather than by the slice.

== Availability ==
New Haven–style pizza is widely available in New Haven and the surrounding area, especially Bridgeport and other nearby coastal cities and towns. New Haven–style restaurants have opened across the United States, though there are some states and many large cities which still have none.

New Haven–style pizza has also gained significant popularity internationally in the United Kingdom in recent years, particularly in London, where several establishments have emerged as prominent purveyors of this distinctive style.

== In media ==
Henry Winkler, Lyle Lovett, Chris Murphy and Michael Bolton discuss the history of New Haven Pizza in Gorman Bechard's documentary Pizza: A Love Story. In the film, the black char imparted from the ovens is described as adding a smoky barbeque flavor not found elsewhere. A recurring phrase spoken by several in the movie is, "It's not burnt, it's charred."

In Netflix's Ugly Delicious, David Chang says, "I think New Haven pizza, as a community, has the best pizza in America." On the show, Mark Iacono, founder of Lucali's pizzeria in Carroll Gardens, Brooklyn takes the train from New York City to New Haven to try tomato pie and white clam pizza at Frank Pepe Pizzeria Napoletana.

In May 2024, Connecticut Representative Rosa DeLauro read a statement declaring New Haven to have "the best pizza in the country" into the Congressional Record, sparking some controversy.

=== Pronounced Ah-Beetz ===
In 2025, filmmaker Gorman Bechard, along with Jason Bischoff-Wurstle, Dean Falcone, and Colin M. Caplan, co-curated an exhibit at the New Haven Museum called Pronounced Ah-Beetz which celebrates the history of New Haven apizza. The exhibit, which opened on October 9, 2025, and will be on display until October 2027, features the history of New Haven's three iconic pizza restaurants: Frank Pepe Pizzeria Napoletana, Sally's Apizza, and Modern Apizza, as well as other pizza restaurants throughout the New Haven area.

The idea grew out of Bechard's documentary Pizza: A Love Story and his visiting the now-shuttered Pizza Museum in Chicago. He felt a pizza museum belonged in New Haven. Numerous items are on display, including the oldest known pizza box from 1936, Frank Pepe's original baking hat, and pizza boxes signed by Yogi Berra and Gwyneth Paltrow.

== See also ==
- Neapolitan pizza
