= Wooster Square =

Neighborhood in New Haven, Connecticut

- Neighborhood of New Haven
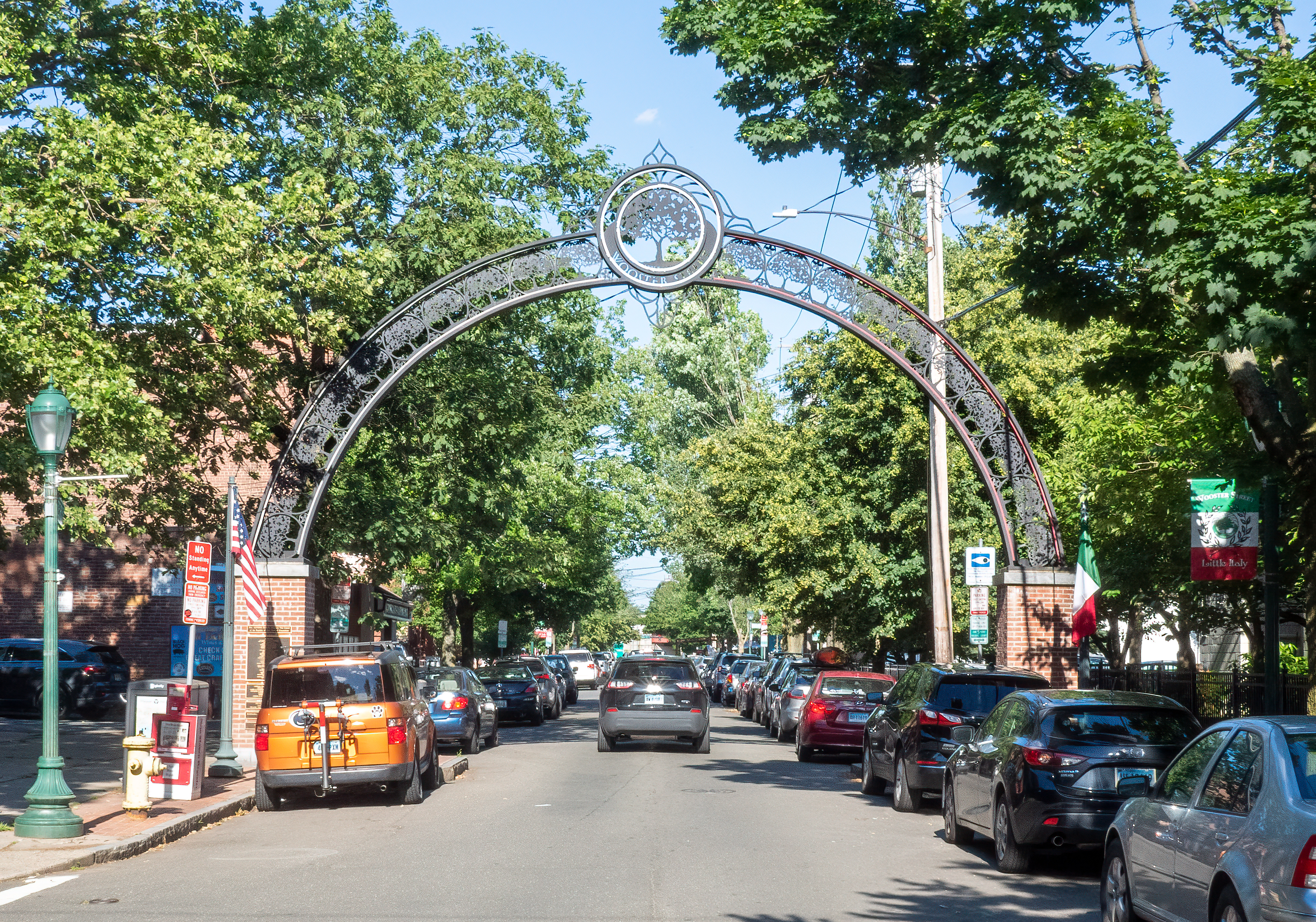
- Wooster Street archway decorated with a cherry blossom tree, a symbol of New Haven

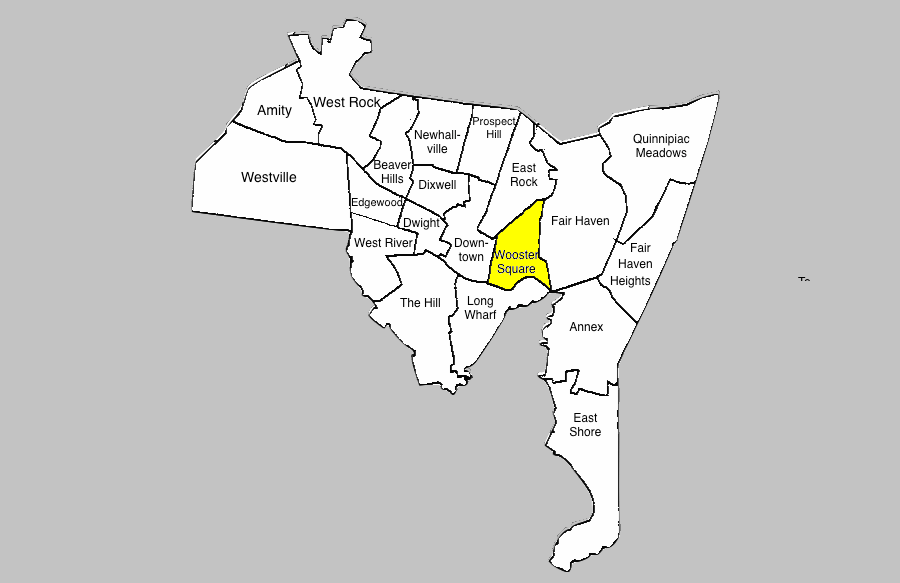
- Wooster Square within New Haven
- Coordinates: 41°18′14″N 72°55′05″W
- Country: United States
- State: Connecticut
- City: New Haven
- Wooster Square Historic District
- U.S. National Register of Historic Places
- U.S. Historic district
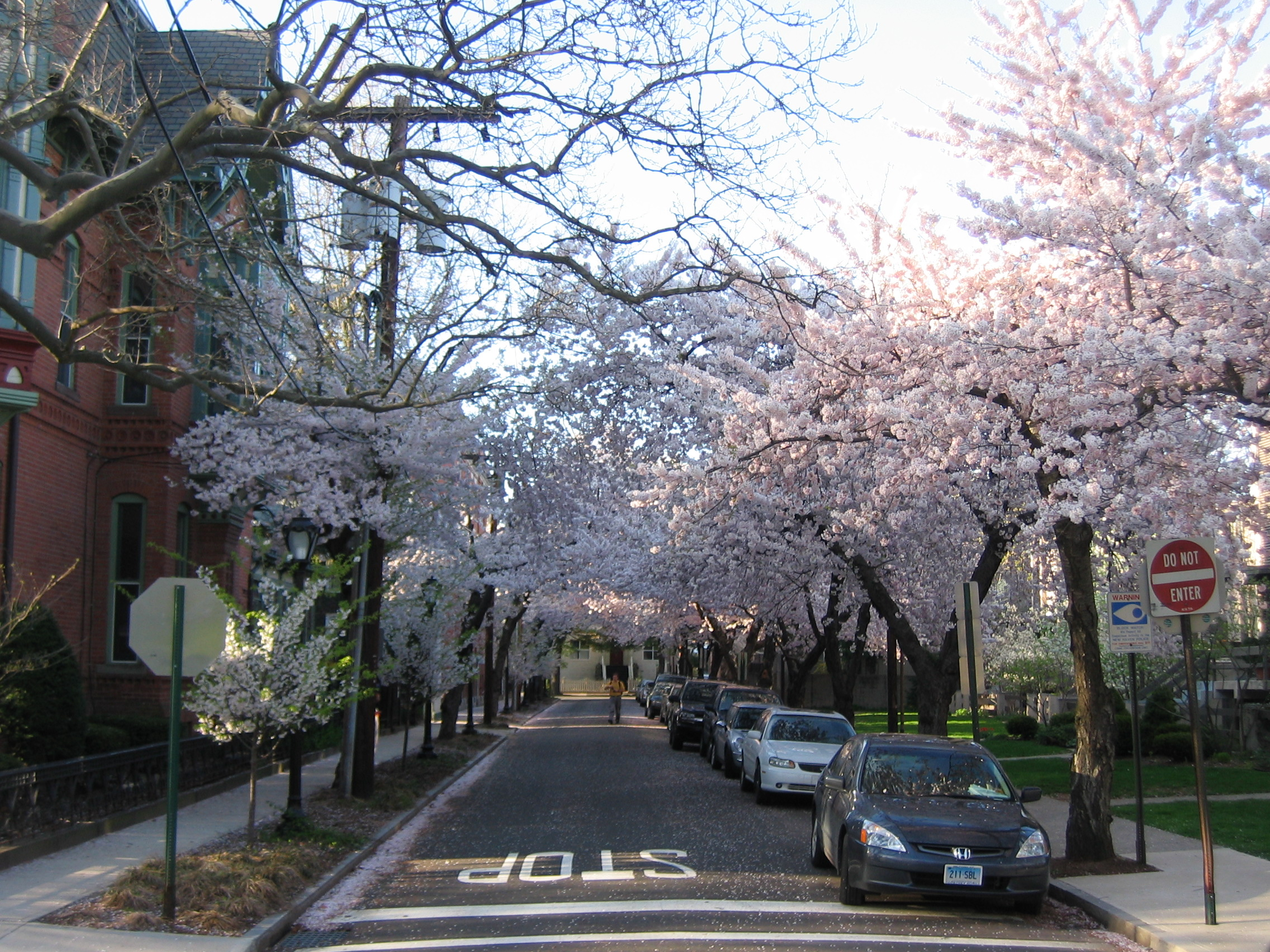
- Cherry trees in the streets surrounding Wooster Square

- Location within Connecticut Location within the United States
- Location: New Haven, Connecticut
- Coordinates: 41°18′16″N 72°55′5″W
- Area: 40 acres (16 ha)
- Architect: Austin, Henry
- Architectural style: Greek Revival, Second Empire, Italianate
- NRHP reference No.: 71000914
- Added to NRHP: August 5, 1971

Wooster Square is a neighborhood in the city of New Haven, Connecticut, to the east of downtown. The name refers to a park square (named for the American Revolutionary War hero, David Wooster) located between Greene Street, Wooster Place, Chapel Street and Academy Street in the center of the neighborhood. Wooster Square is also known as Little Italy: a bastion of Italian American culture and cuisine, and is home to some of New Haven's (and the country's), best-known pizza (specifically, apizza) eateries, including Frank Pepe Pizzeria Napoletana and Sally's Apizza. The square and much of the neighborhood are included in the Wooster Square Historic District, which was listed on the National Register of Historic Places in 1971.

An annual Cherry Blossom Festival in Wooster Square Park commemorates the planting of 72 Yoshino Japanese cherry blossom trees in 1973 by the New Haven Historic Commission in collaboration with the New Haven Parks Department and neighborhood residents. The festival, founded and organized by the Historic Wooster Square Association, has grown from a modest event in the early 1970s with a local band entertaining a handful of neighbors under lighted trees to a major New Haven event that in 2016 attracted over 10,000 visitors.

== Geography ==
The Wooster Square neighborhood consists of the area between the Amtrak railroad tracks (serving as the boundary with Downtown New Haven) and Interstate 91 (between Exits 1 and 3), bounded on the south by the Oak Street Connector. It is bordered on the west by Downtown New Haven, on the south by Long Wharf, on the east by the neighborhood of Mill River, and on the north by East Rock.

== History ==
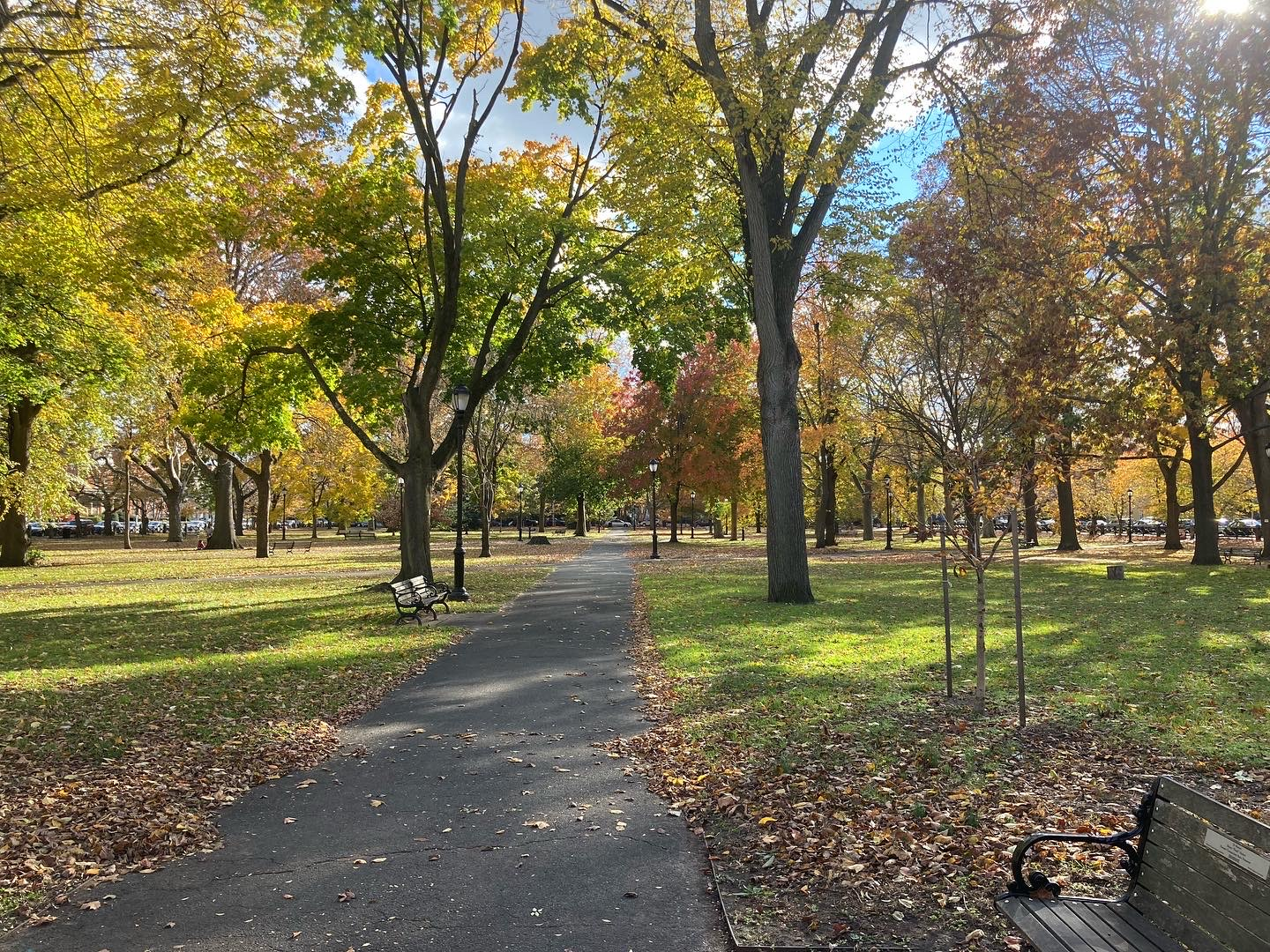
Wooster Square Park

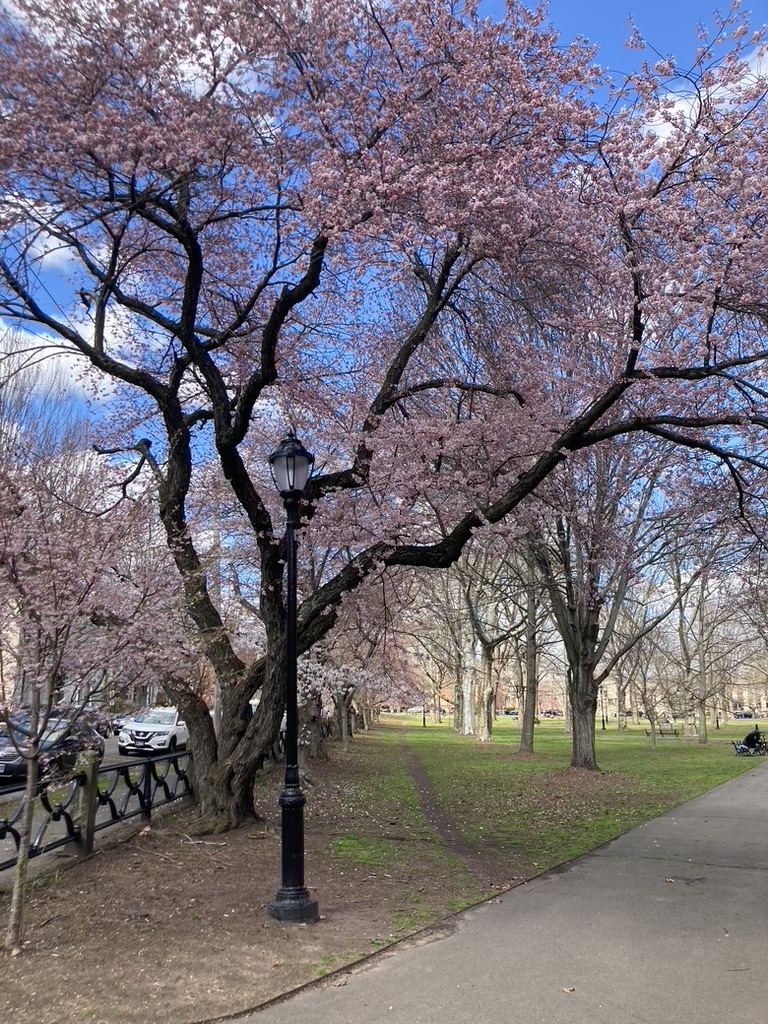
Cherry blossom trees in bloom

Wooster Square takes its name from General David Wooster, a hero of the American Revolutionary War who at one time owned a warehouse near the southern end of the area, near Water Street. In 1825 the land was purchased by the city of New Haven and incorporated into the city; the site had previously been open land. At that time, the area was close to the city's waterfront (it is now farther inland due to harbor filling), and by the 1840s it had become a residential area where ship captains and wholesale grocers built large houses near the port. As a result, Wooster Square now includes a concentrated collection of distinctive 19th-century residential architecture, including several buildings by New Haven architect Henry Austin. Included are examples of the Federal, Greek Revival, Islamic Revival, and Italian Villa styles, Late Victorian Italianate row houses, and Second Empire and Queen Anne homes.

By the late 19th century, increased industrial activity in the vicinity made Wooster Square less desirable as a residential neighborhood, and Italian immigrant families began to move in and operate small stores out of their homes. This commercial activity damaged the neighborhood's reputation. By the 1930s there were calls in the city to raze the neighborhood. In the mid-1950s, plans called for building Interstate 91 through Wooster Square Park, but the Wooster Square Project, which started in 1958, began a neighborhood revival and resulted in re-routing of the highway. The preservation plans were developed in conjunction with architecture students from Yale University. The rehabilitation of the area was achieved at a time when historic preservation grants and loans were not generally available to homeowners.

Wooster Square made headlines on June 24, 2020, when its Christopher Columbus statue was removed by a city-hired crew in the aftermath of the George Floyd Protests. City officials later announced the commission of a new statue to replace the Columbus statue. The new statue, which was installed in May 2024, depicts an Italian family.

== Historic district ==
The Wooster Square Historic District encompasses much of the Wooster Square. Centered on a rectangular park named in honor of General David Wooster, the area was developed as a residential neighborhood beginning in the 1820s, and was by the 1840s a desirable area to live, with many high-quality Greek Revival homes. In the 1950s the area was the subject of a major community-led preservation effort that drew national attention. The district was listed on the National Register of Historic Places in 1971.

The historic district does not encompass the entire Wooster Square neighborhood. It covers 40 acres (16 ha) at the center, including the park and a ring of streets extending one block away. Prominent houses that have been attributed to architect Henry Austin include the Howland House at 42 Academy Street, the Willis Bristol House at 584 Chapel Street, and the Governor English House at 592 Chapel Street. The latter house was built for James E. English, a prominent politician who served as a United States Senator and as Governor of Connecticut. The most prominent non-residential building in the district is the Conte School on its eastern edge, built in 1965 during the rehabilitation period.

== Culture and commerce ==
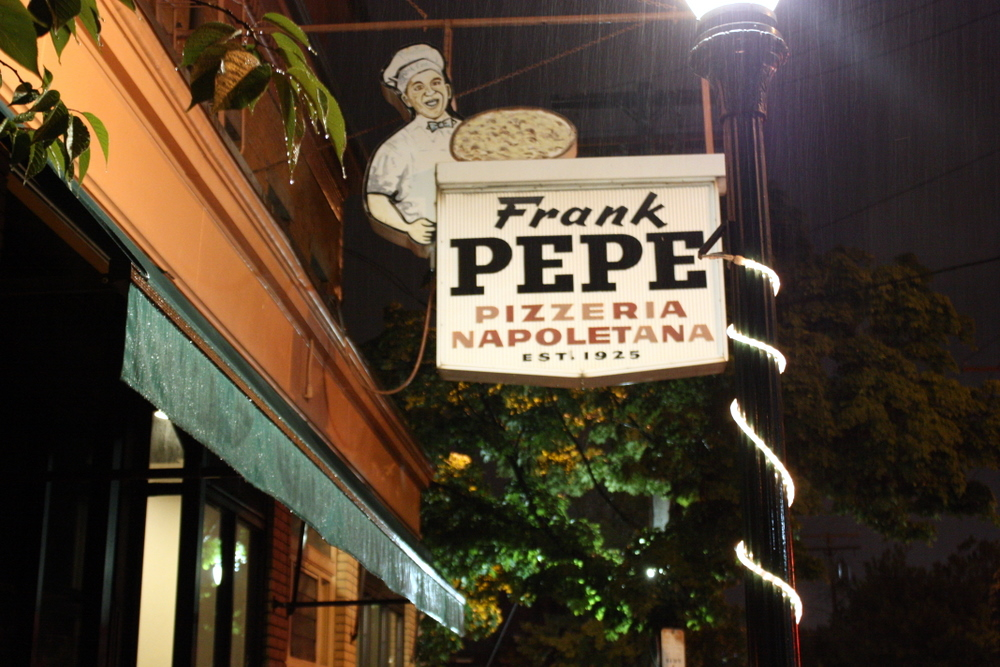
Exterior of Pepe's, one of several Wooster Square pizzerias.

Wooster Square is home to restaurants, bakeries, local businesses, and a weekly farmer's market, City Seed. Its walkable proximity to Downtown New Haven and architecture make it one of the most popular New Haven neighborhoods to live.

A sycamore tree on the west side of Wooster Square Park has been said by some observers to resemble an outline image of Jesus Christ.

== List of streets ==
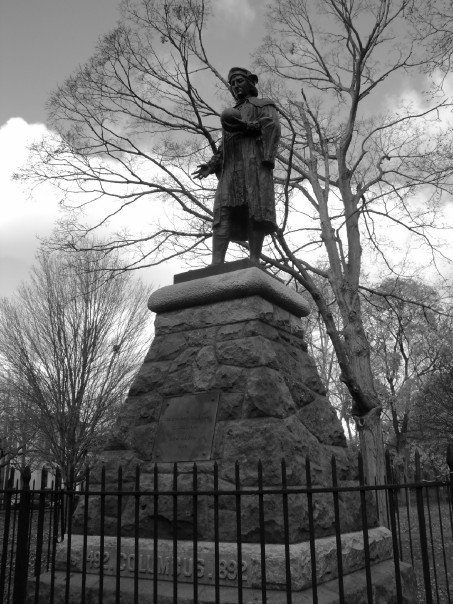
Bronze statue of Christopher Columbus formerly located at Wooster Square in New Haven, Connecticut. The statue was removed by the city Parks Commission on June 24th, 2020

- Academy Street
- Artizan Street
- Bradley Street
- Bridge Street
- Brown Street
- Chapel Street
- Chestnut Street
- Court Street
- Depalma Court
- East Street
- Fair Street
- Forbes Avenue
- Franklin Street
- Grand Avenue
- Greene Street
- Hamilton Street
- Hughes Place
- Ives Place
- Jefferson Street
- Lyon Street
- New Street
- Olive Street
- Osborn Street
- Saint John Street
- Union Street
- Wallace Street
- Warren Street
- Water Street
- William Street
- Wooster Place
- Wooster Street (named for Revolutionary War hero David Wooster)

== Notable people ==
- Hunter Biden (former resident) - lawyer, second son of President Joe Biden
- Rosa DeLauro (born and raised) - U.S. Congresswoman

== Gallery ==
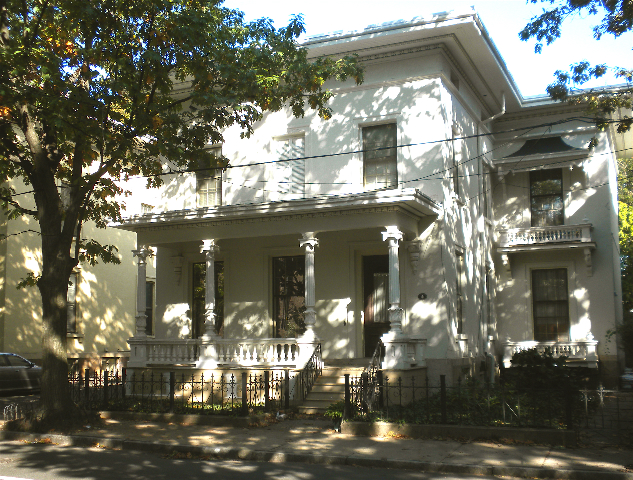
William Lewis House (1850), 613 Chapel Street

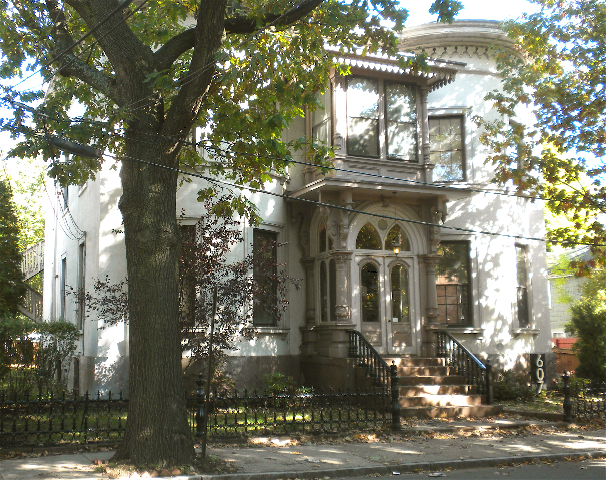
Second Nelson Hotchkiss House (1854), 607 Chapel Street

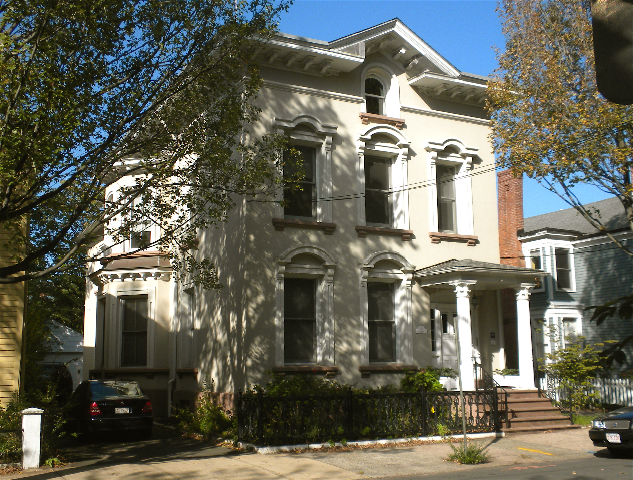
10 Academy Street

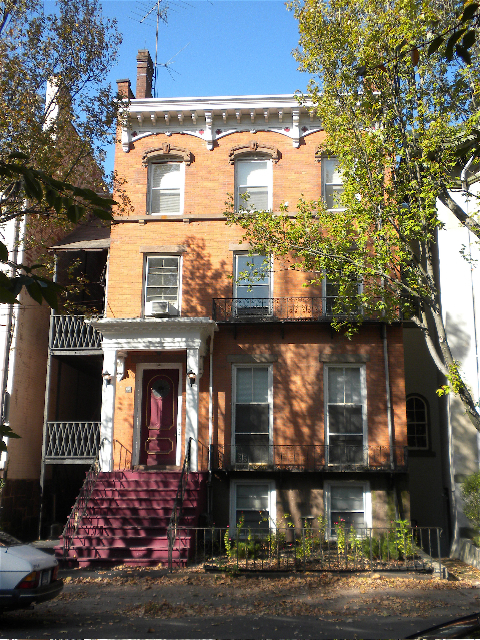
40 Academy Street (1846)

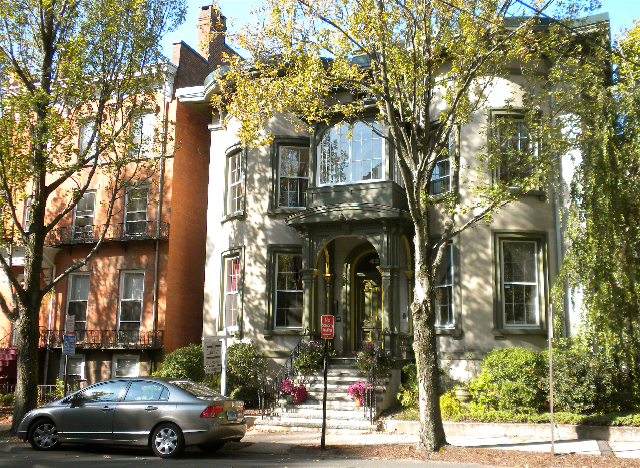
Edward Rowland House (1857), 42 Academy Street

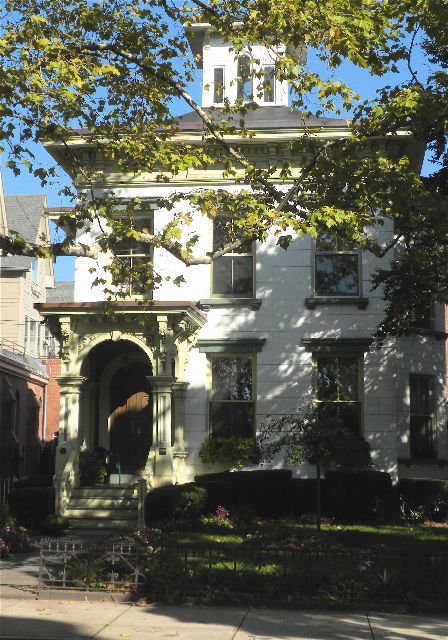
323 Greene Street (about 1870).

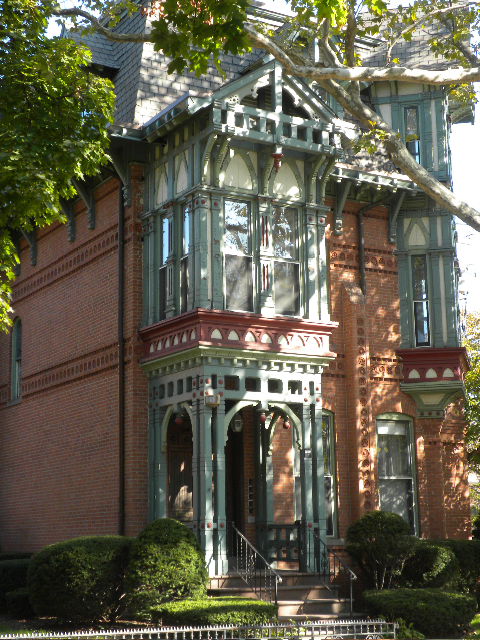
Max Adler House (1879), 311 Greene Street Adler was owner of Strouse, Adler a block away on Olive Street

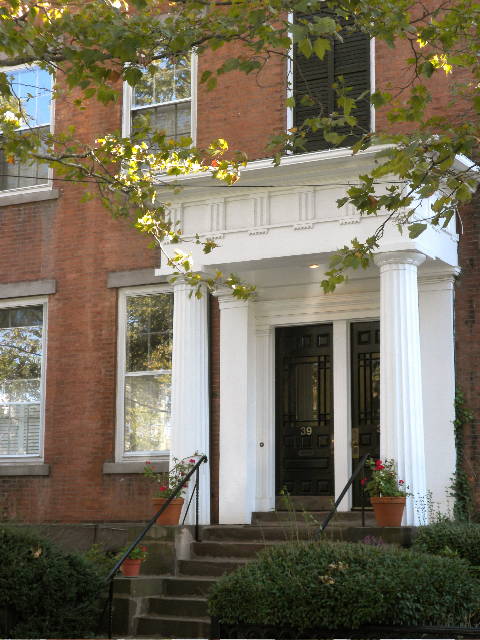
John Robertson House (about 1833), 37-39 Wooster Place.

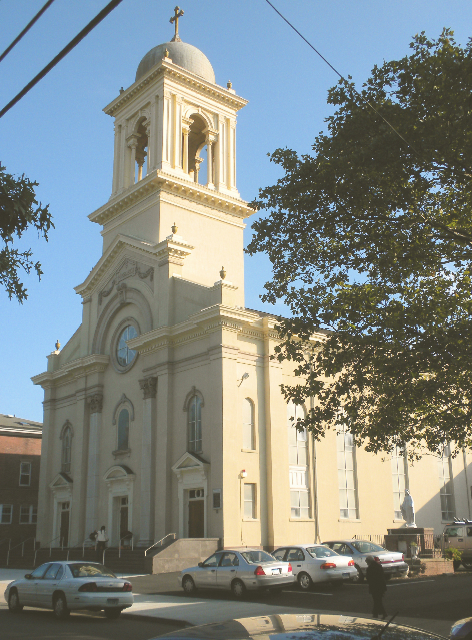
Wooster Square Congregational Church, now St. Michael's Catholic Church (1855-1904), 29 Wooster Place.

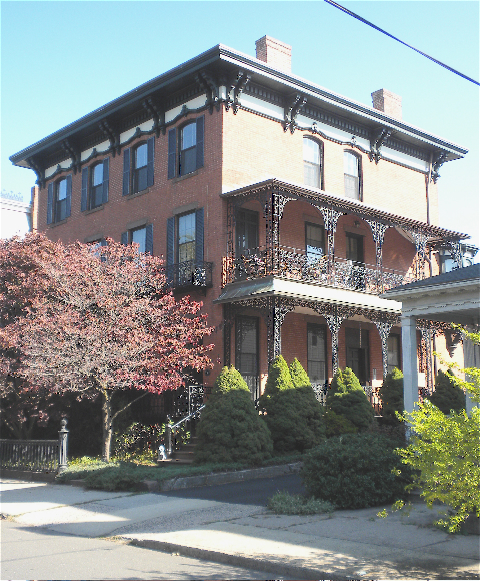
Russell Hotchkiss House (1844), 7 Wooster Place.

== See also ==
- National Register of Historic Places listings in New Haven, Connecticut
