= New Haven Museum and Historical Society =

Museum in Connecticut, United States

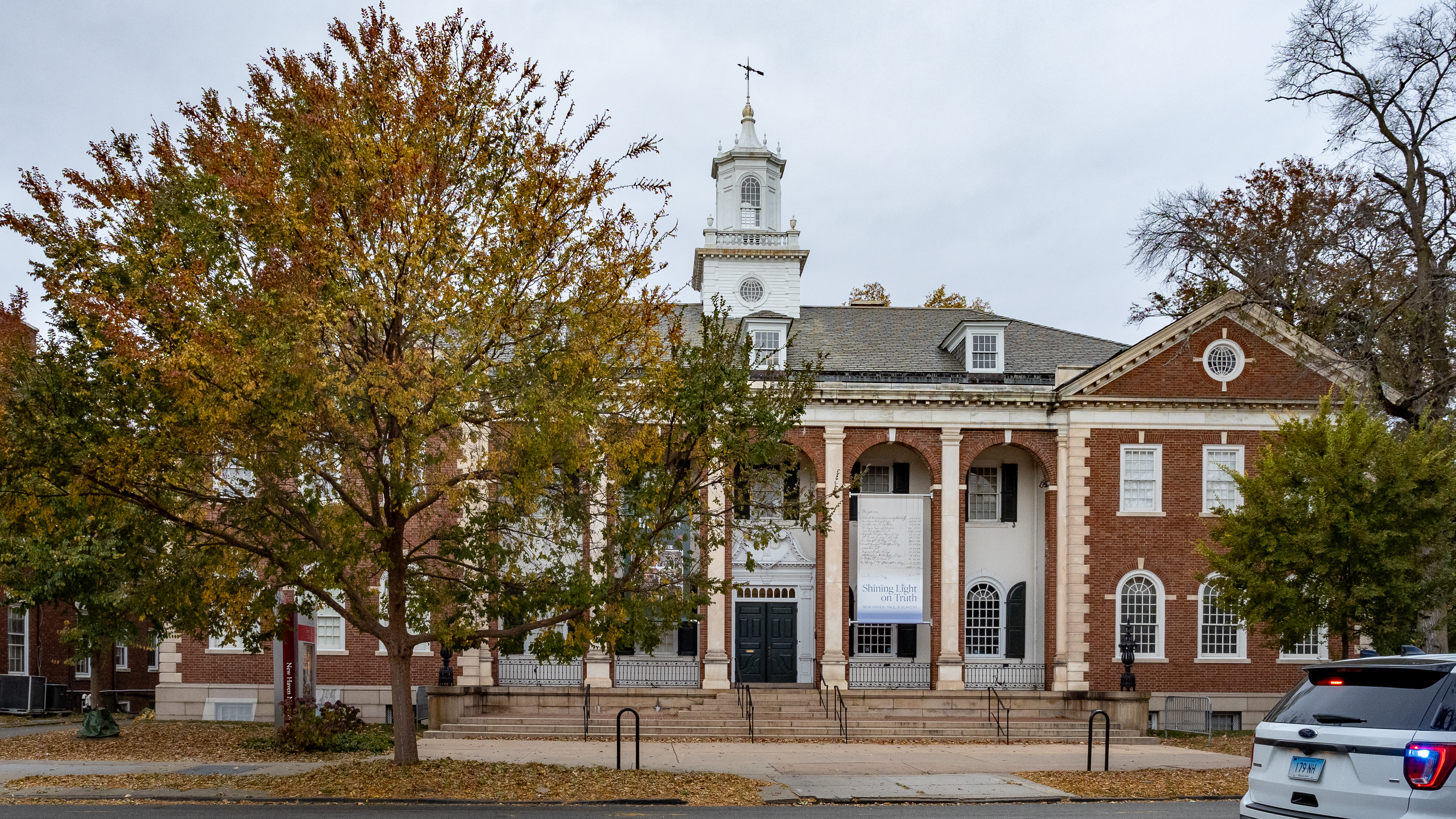
- Established: 1862
- Location: 114 Whitney Avenue; New Haven, Connecticut
- Coordinates: 41.31395°N 72.92185°W
- Type: Historical
- Website: www.newhavenmuseum.org

The New Haven Museum and Historical Society (originally known as the New Haven Colony Historical Society) was founded in 1862 in New Haven, Connecticut for the purposes of preserving and presenting the region's history. The museum has a collection containing art, photography, furniture and other artifacts from throughout New Haven's history and regularly presents programs and special exhibits.

The Museum features exhibitions on New Haven, La Amistad, local art and decorative arts, with collections associated with Eli Whitney, Winchester, Yale, East Rock, Noah Webster, Benedict Arnold as well as changing exhibitions. Educational programs provide interactive inquiry-based learning on local history.

The Whitney Research Library at the museum contains manuscript and archival holdings relevant to the New Haven area from the time of the first settlement to the present. The collection includes rare books, more than 300 manuscript collections, including personal papers, business and institutional records, court and municipal documents, maps, 4,000 architectural drawings and resources, account books and a collection of approximately 75,000 photographs. It also contains approximately 30,000 printed titles including monographs and pamphlets. The library also includes genealogical materials, vital statistics and colonial and town records, passenger arrival lists to American ports, Federal census schedules for New Haven County on microfilm and a complete set of New Haven city directories from 1840.

The Colonial revival style current building was built in 1929 and was designed by J. Frederick Kelly. The building includes a number of artifacts from demolished New Haven houses including a mantelpiece and urns from the Nathan Smith house and a mantelpiece from the Benedict Arnold house. The Ingersoll Room in the museum is decorated with furniture and portraits from the eighteenth and nineteenth centuries documenting the home and life of New Haven's Ingersoll family.

== See also ==
- List of historical societies in Connecticut
