= Tourism in Portland, Oregon =

Sights and attractions for visitors to Portland, Oregon, USA

Often referred to as the "City of Roses," Portland, Oregon attracts visitors due to its diverse culinary scene, vast urban parks, tax-free shopping and proximity to areas of outstanding natural beauty of the Pacific Northwest.

Portland's restaurants have been described as a "critical contributor" to the travel economy.

== Attractions ==
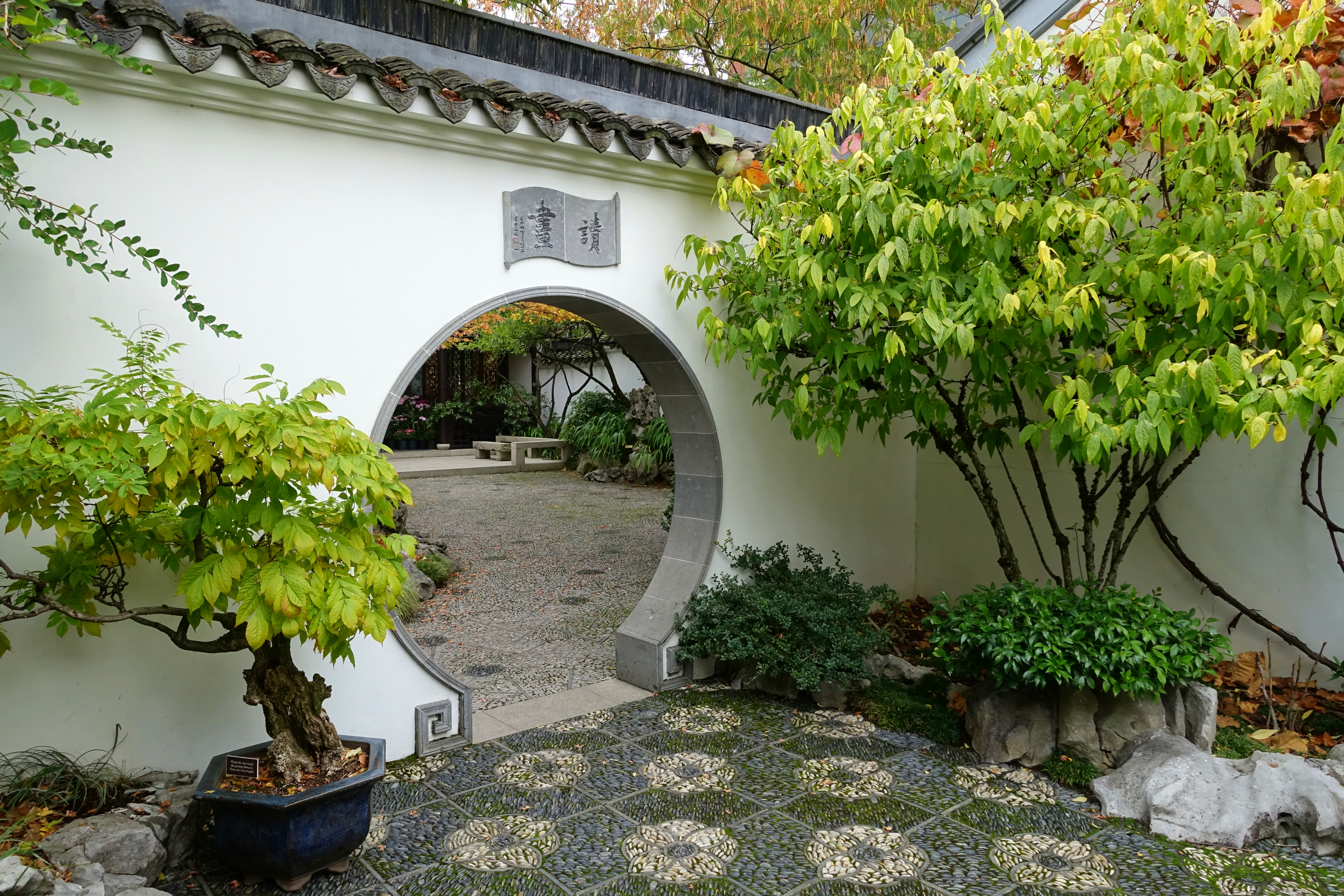
Lan Su Chinese Garden

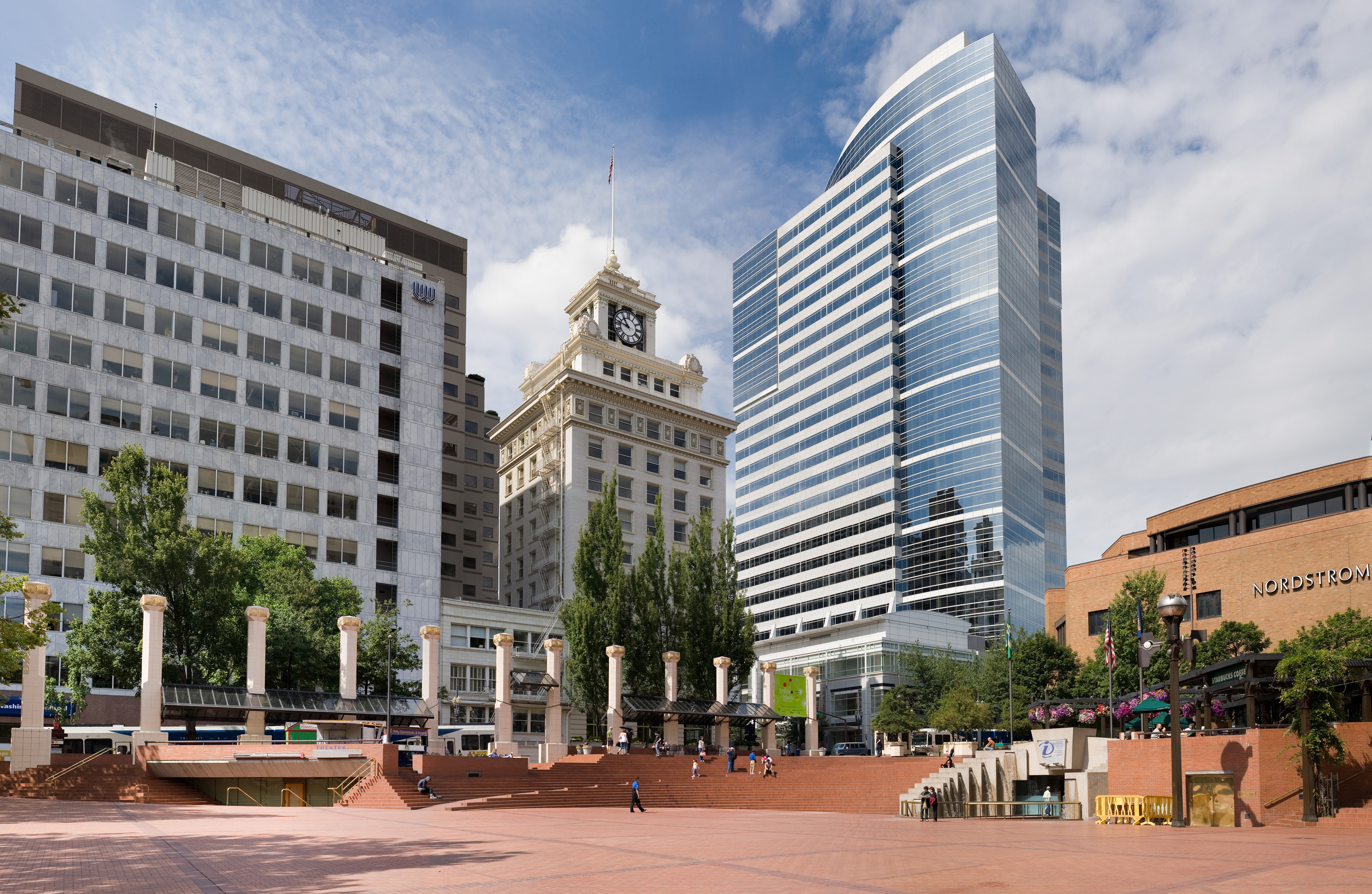
Pioneer Courthouse Square

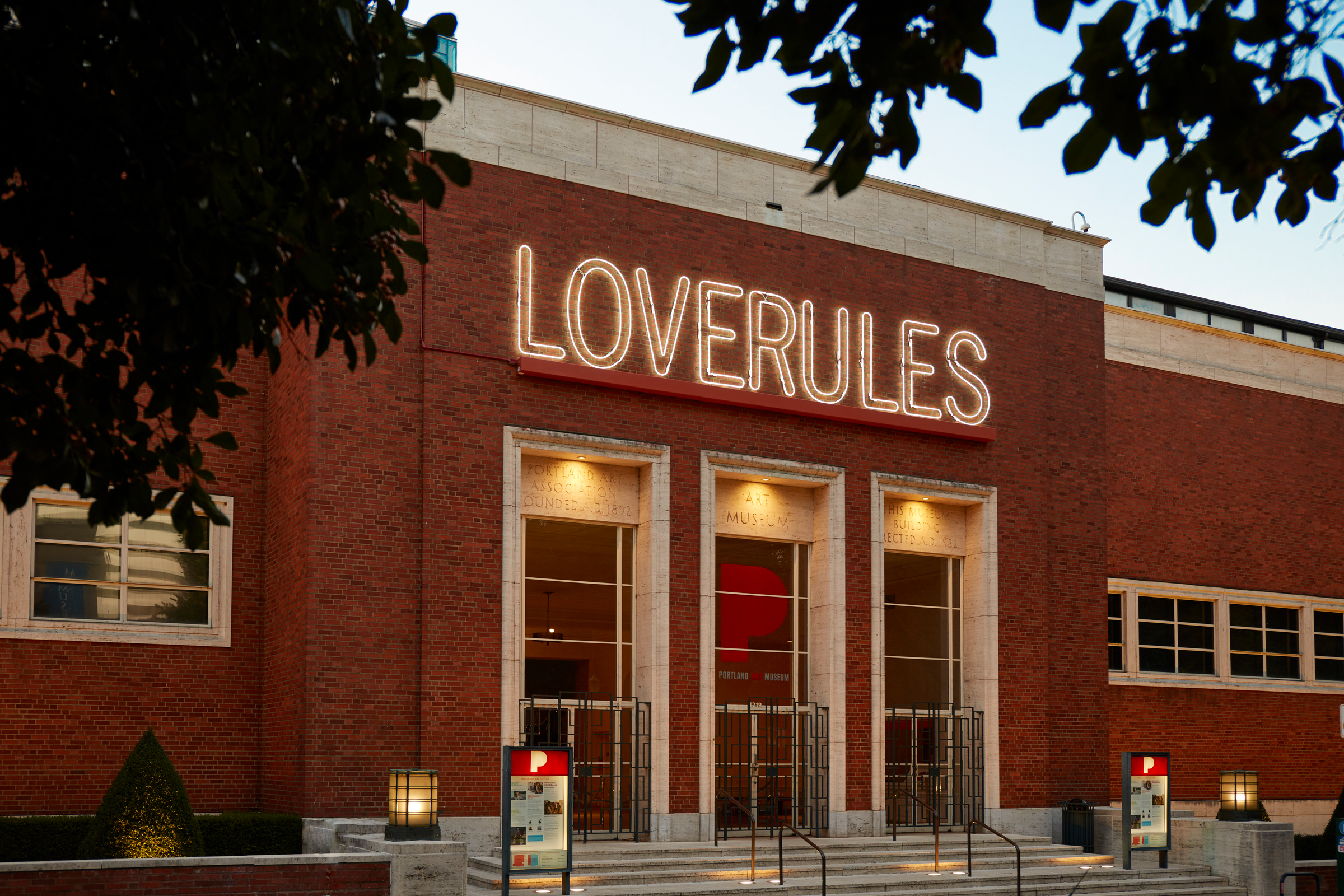
Portland Art Museum

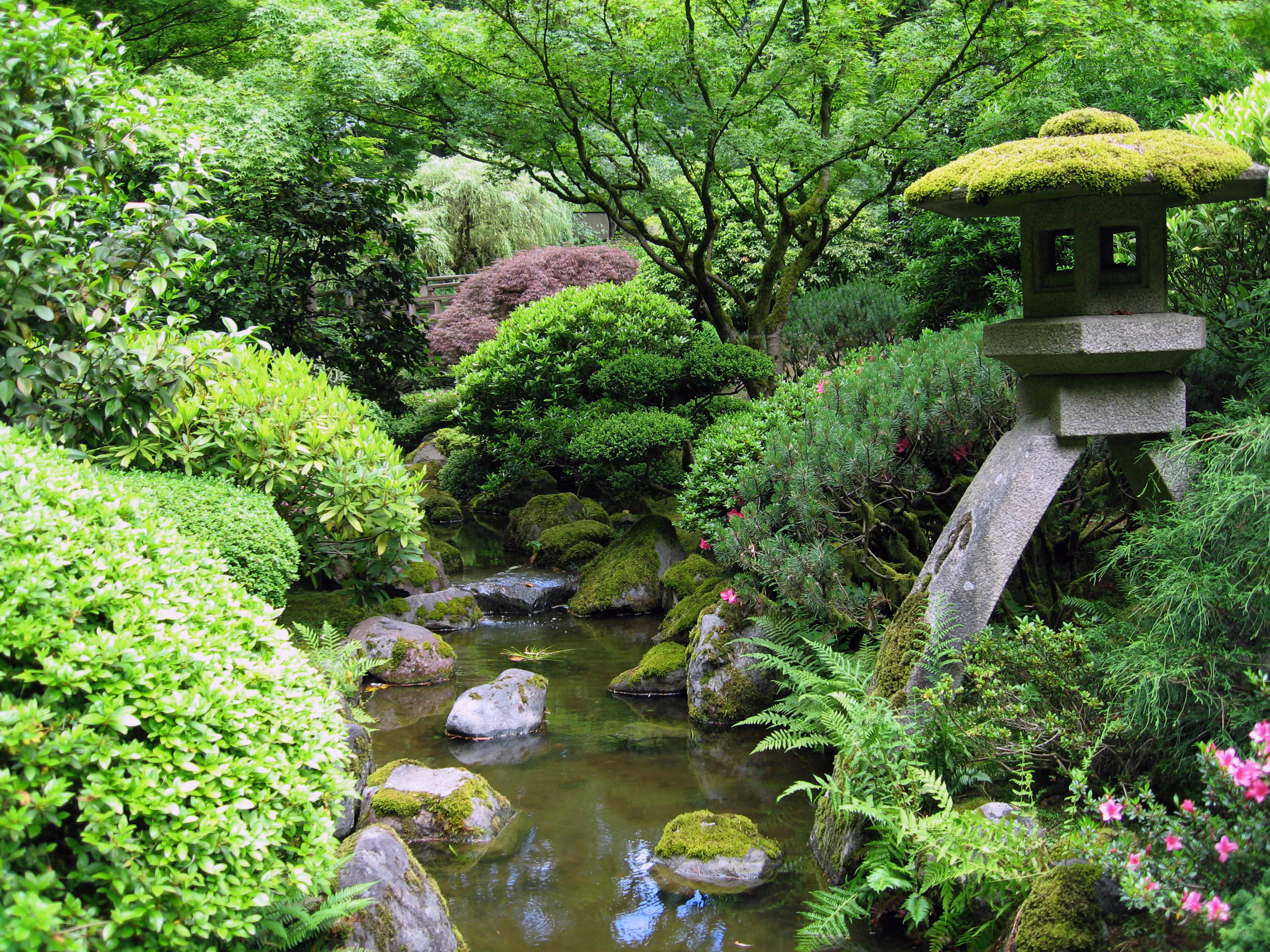
Portland Japanese Garden

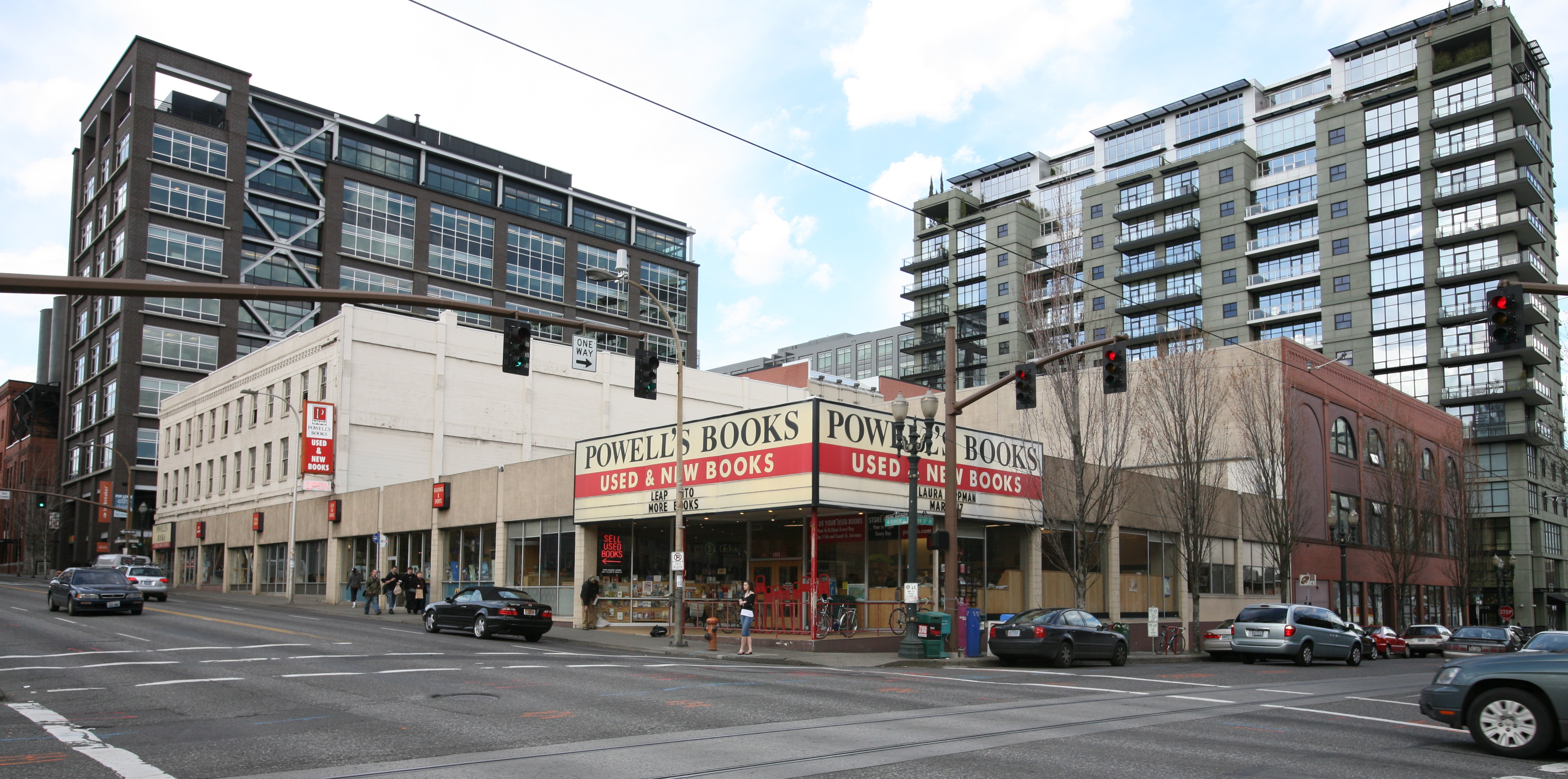
Powell's Books

The city boasts a number of attractions, such as the Portland Japanese Garden, Oregon Museum of Science and Industry, Oregon Zoo, Powell's Books, Lan Su Chinese Garden and the historic Pittock Mansion.

Portland's proximity to the Columbia River Gorge, Mount Hood, Willamette Valley and the Oregon Coast attracts outdoor enthusiasts seeking to engage in activities such as hiking, skiing, mountain biking and wind-surfing.

Some of Portland's districts and neighborhoods have been described as tourist attractions, including East Burnside, North Mississippi Avenue, Northeast Alberta Street, Northwest 23rd Avenue, Pearl District, and Southeast Division Street.

The city's culinary landscape features over 500 food carts, more than 70 breweries, and many farm-to-table dining options, making it a popular destination for foodies. In 2018, Eater Portland published a list of "tourist trap" restaurants in the city "that are actually good"; the list included Voodoo Doughnut, Blue Star Donuts, Clyde Common, Departure Restaurant and Lounge, Lardo, Multnomah Whiskey Library, Pine State Biscuits, Pok Pok, Salt & Straw, and Screen Door.

=== List ===
- Alpenrose Dairy
- Crystal Springs Rhododendron Garden
- Eastbank Esplanade
- Forest Park
- Freakybuttrue Peculiarium
- The Grotto
- Hollywood Theatre
- International Rose Test Garden
- Lan Su Chinese Garden
- Laurelhurst Park
- Mill Ends Park
- Mount Tabor Park
- Movie Madness Video
- Oaks Amusement Park
- Oregon Historical Society Museum
- Oregon Jewish Museum
- Oregon Museum of Science and Industry
- Oregon Zoo
- Peninsula Park
- Pioneer Courthouse Square
- Pittock Mansion
- Portland Aerial Tram
- Portland Art Museum
- Portland Chinatown Museum
- Portland Japanese Garden
- Portland Puppet Museum
- Portland Saturday Market
- Portland Spirit
- Powell's Books
- Shanghai tunnels
- Stark's Vacuum Museum
- Statue of Paul Bunyan
- Tilikum Crossing
- Velveteria (closed in 2010)
- Voodoo Doughnut
- Washington Park

== Cannabis tourism ==
The legalization of cannabis consumption for recreational purposes in Oregon has allowed Portland to capitalize on cannabis tourism.

== Hotel industry ==
In 2024, KATU said " 354,140 hotel rooms were sold in August, the highest since 2019 when there were 409,851 rooms sold". According to The Oregonian, Portland hotels were 70 percent booked during June-August 2024.

== Marketing ==
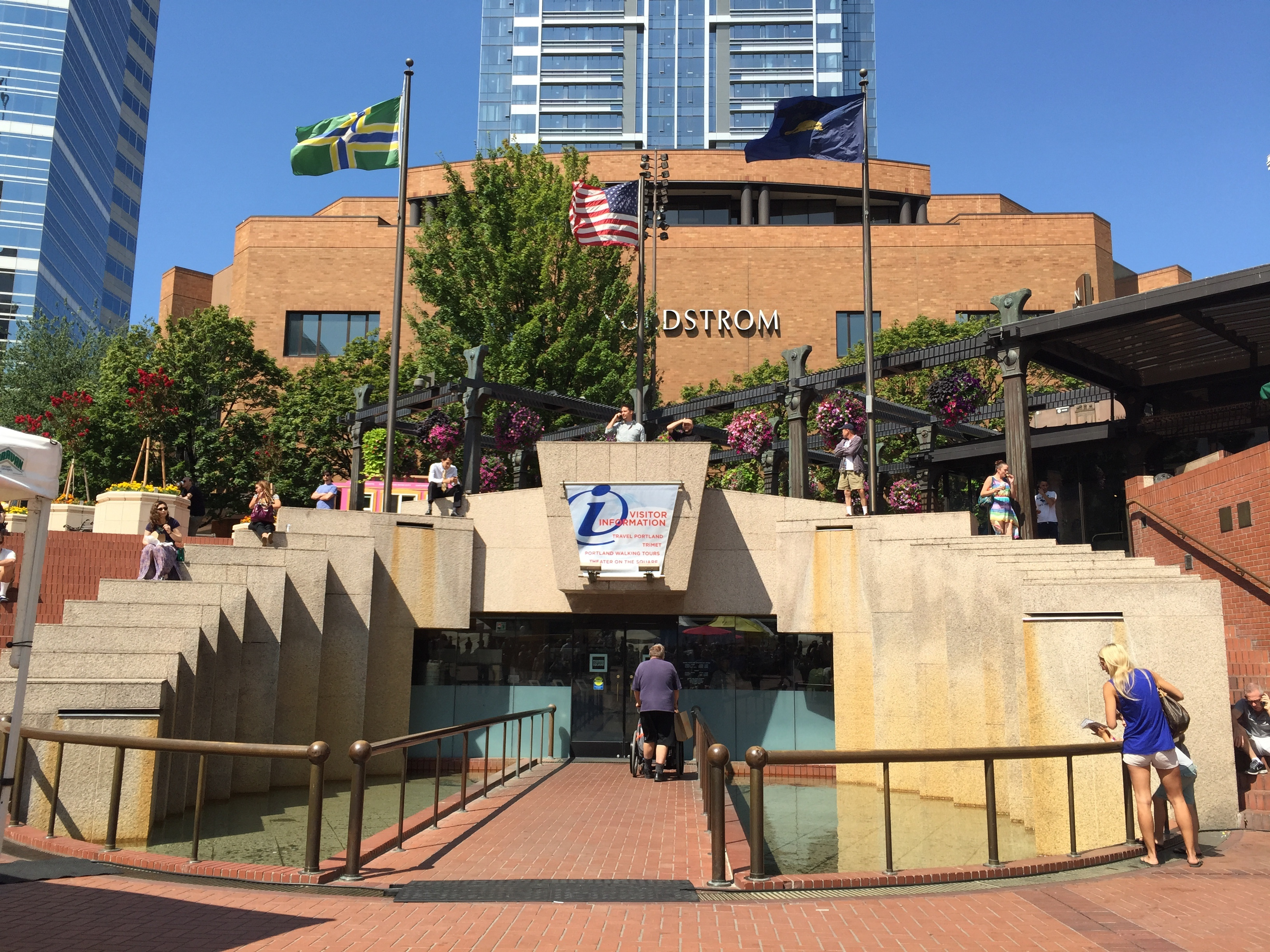
Travel Portland has operated a visitors center at Pioneer Courthouse Square (pictured in 2015).

Travel Portland is a destination marketing organization responsible for generating travel demand for Portland.

== Visitor statistics and economic impact ==
In 2024, KATU said, "In 2022, the city spent 36% more on tourism than it did in 2021, but 8.3% less than it did overall from 2019-2022. As for tourism earnings, the city experienced a booming increase of 25% from 2021 - 2022... but overall earned 2.7% less from 2019-2022. This pattern is reflected in tourism industry jobs as well. Portland hired 32,400 jobs from 2021-2022, a net increase of 19%. However, due to the deficit of tourism jobs in 2020 and 2021, the city overall has experienced a net loss of 12.3% for tourism industry jobs since 2019."

In 2023, Portland area tourism generated $5.4 billion in direct spending from 12.1 million overnight person-trips. That visitor spending is estimated to have supported 34,400 jobs, generating $1.7 billion in employment earnings.

In 2024, Portland saw 2.4 million visitors during each of the months of June, July, and August, according to a foot traffic report published by Downtown Portland Clean & Safe.

== See also ==
- Culture of Portland, Oregon
- Lists of Oregon-related topics
