= List of museums in Portland, Oregon =

This list of museums in Portland, Oregon encompasses museums defined for this context as institutions (including nonprofit organizations, government entities, and private businesses) that collect and care for objects of cultural, artistic, scientific, or historical interest and make their collections or related exhibits available for public viewing. Museums that exist only in cyberspace (i.e., virtual museums) are not included. Also included are non-profit and university art galleries.

== Museums ==
Name	Neighborhood	Area	Type	Summary
3D Center of Art and Photography			Art	Antique and contemporary 3D imagery, currently closed and seeking new location
Architectural Heritage Center	Buckman	Southeast	Art - Architecture	Website; changing exhibits about architecture and art
Blue Sky Gallery	Pearl District	Northwest	Art	Photography gallery
Cooley Gallery	Eastmoreland	Southeast	Art	Website; part of Reed College
Gallery 114	Old Town Chinatown	Northwest	Art	website, non-profit artists' collective and gallery in all media
Hat Museum	Hosford-Abernethy	Southeast	Commodity - Hats	Website; displays a selection of most characteristic styles of past eras; in the Ladd-Reingold House; open for private tours for costumers, fashion and history academics and for millinery students
Kidd's Toy Museum	Buckman	Southeast	Toy	Includes mechanical banks; trains, planes and automobiles; character toys; police badges; railroad locks, lanterns and related items; early Oregon memorabilia; teddy bears and dolls; and holiday collectibles
Movie Madness Video	Sunnyside	Southeast	Media	Video rental shop and museum of film history with costumes, props and Hollywood memorabilia
Museum of Odd History	University Park	North	Fraternal History	History of Odd Fellows and their contributions to the development of North Portland Website
Oregon Historical Society Museum	Downtown	Southwest	Multiple	State history, science, art
Oregon Jewish Museum and Centre for Holocaust Education	Northwest District	Northwest	Ethnic - Jewish	Jewish culture in Oregon, America and the world, art, history
Japanese American Museum of Oregon	Old Town Chinatown	Northwest	Ethnic - Japanese	Website; lives and contributions of Oregon's Nikkei community, located in Portland's old Japantown area
Oregon Maritime Museum	Downtown	Southwest	Maritime	Located on the steam sternwheeler Portland in Tom McCall Waterfront Park
Oregon Museum of Science and Industry (OMSI)	Hosford-Abernethy	Southeast	Science	Also includes the USS Blueback (SS-581) submarine and a planetarium
Oregon Rail Heritage Center	Hosford-Abernethy	Southeast	Railroad	Vintage railroad equipment, including steam and diesel locomotives and passenger coaches
Pacific Northwest College of Art Galleries	Pearl District	Northwest	Art	Campus includes twelve public exhibition galleries, two professional galleries and ten spaces reserved for student and community showings
Pittock Mansion	Hillside	Northwest	Historic house	22 room French Renaissance estate situated on 46 acres (190,000 m^{2})
Portland Art Museum	Downtown	Southwest	Art	Includes centers for Native American, Northwest art, and modern and contemporary art, Asian art, an outdoor public sculpture garden, and the Northwest Film Center
Portland Community College Cascade Gallery	Humboldt	Northeast	Art	Website, on the Cascade Campus
Portland Community College North View Gallery	Far Southwest	Southwest	Art	Website, on the Sylvania Campus
Portland Institute for Contemporary Art	Downtown	Southwest	Art	Contemporary performance and visual arts
Portland Police Museum	Downtown	Southwest	Police	Photographs, equipment, uniforms, and documents; run by the Portland Police Historical Society
Portland Puppet Museum	Southeast Uplift	Southeast	Puppet	website
Portland State University School of Art & Design Galleries	Downtown	Southwest	Art	Website. MK, Autzen, AB Lobby and Broadway Galleries
Stark's Vacuum Museum	Kerns	Northeast	Commodity - Vacuum cleaners	Collection of 300 items includes the two-person-operated Busy-Bee (one person pumps, the other vacuums); operated by Stark's Vacuum Cleaner Sales & Service
VintageTek	Hayhurst	Southwest	Technology	website, historic Tektronix equipment
World Forestry Center	Washington Park	Southwest	Industry - Forestry	Forest industry, importance and natural history of forests
Jordan Schnitzer Museum of Art at Portland State University	Downtown	Southwest	Art	website Free Academic Museum on the Portland State University campus, with changing exhibitions featuring national and international artists
Portland Insectarium				Website
The Freakybuttrue Peculiarium and Museum				Website
The Zymoglyphic Museum	Mount Tabor			Website

== Defunct museums ==
- American Advertising Museum, closed 2004
- The Faux Museum, closed January 2015
- Velveteria, closed January 2010
- Museum of Contemporary Craft, closed 2016
- Oregon Sports Hall of Fame, museum closed 2008
- Portland Children's Museum, closed June 2021
- Wells Fargo History Museum, closed in 2021

== See also ==
- Culture of Portland, Oregon
- List of museums in Oregon
