= Smithsonian Affiliations =

American museum partnership organization

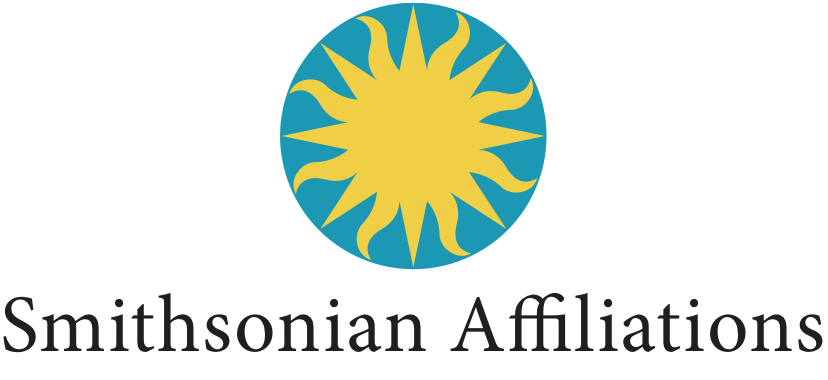
- Established: 1996
- Location: Washington, D.C.
- Director: Myriam Springuel
- Website: affiliations.si.edu

Smithsonian Affiliations is a division of the Smithsonian Institution that establishes long-term partnerships with non-Smithsonian museums and educational and cultural organizations to share collections, exhibitions and educational strategies and to conduct joint research. Partner organizations are known as "Smithsonian Affiliates".

== History ==
The Smithsonian Affiliations program was established in 1996 by Smithsonian Secretary I. Michael Heyman with the approval of the Smithsonian Board of Regents. According to Heyman, the program responded to several challenges the Institution faced at the time: a decrease in federal funding, limited storage space for expanding collections, and the goal of making the Institution more reflective of the nation without operating additional museums outside of Washington, D.C.

=== Commission on the Future of the Smithsonian Institution ===
In 1993, the Commission on the Future of the Smithsonian Institution introduced the first proposal for collections-based partnerships at the Institution. The Commission, composed of 22 members appointed by the Smithsonian Board of Regents, was charged with examining the Institution's ability to uphold James Smithson's vision of an organization dedicated to "the increase and diffusion of knowledge" amid a changing society and increasing financial pressures. Of the four initiatives proposed by the Commission—Educate More of the Nation's People; Collections, Research and Exhibitions; Governance; and Assure the Future—two addressed partnerships and access to the collections. The first, "To Educate More of the Nation's People", called for building partnerships with other museums, research centers, and educational institutions. The second, "Collections, Research and Exhibitions", called for a master plan for the collections that included sharing them through long-term or permanent loans to partner institutions.

The Commission stated that lending artifacts to other museums in a responsible way could make the Institution more reflective of the nation and help address the problem of storing, curating, studying, and exhibiting its growing collections.

=== Creating Smithsonian Affiliations ===
In 1996, during his second year as Secretary, Heyman identified several challenges facing the Institution that aligned with the Commission's 1993 findings: limited storage for expanding collections, decreasing funds, and the goal of reinforcing the Smithsonian's identity as a national museum. The Institution also saw increased interest from outside museums in partnerships and loans beyond standing practices. Although collaborative agreements in the form of traveling exhibitions, joint exhibition sponsorship, and loans had been entered into by individual Smithsonian museums in the past, no infrastructure existed to provide institution-wide oversight and coordination of such partnerships. Heyman created the Smithsonian Affiliations program to oversee and manage collections-based partnerships with other museums. According to the minutes of the Smithsonian Board of Regents meeting housed in the Smithsonian Institution Archives, the program was formally approved by the Board of Regents on September 15, 1996.

Smithsonian Affiliations was one of several outreach initiatives Heyman introduced around the Institution's 150th anniversary to expand its national reach. Other initiatives from the same period included an expanded presence on the World Wide Web and America's Smithsonian, the largest traveling exhibition the Smithsonian had mounted. Heyman announced the Affiliations program in opening remarks at the Smithsonian's 150th Birthday Party on the Mall and at openings of America's Smithsonian in several cities.

=== Growth of the program ===
At the end of the 1997 fiscal year, there were 21 organizations recognized as Affiliates. As of 2017, there were over 200 Affiliates.

== Program overview ==
Partner organizations may use the tag line "In Association with the Smithsonian Institution" and the Smithsonian Affiliations logo on their website, programming, and marketing material. Any 501(c)(3) nonprofit or publicly operated educational entity may apply to become a Smithsonian Affiliate.

Eligibility is open to non-profit or publicly operated organizations whose missions involve research, knowledge, and education in science, history, and the arts. Under the program's guidelines, the Smithsonian Institution retains control over all collections it loans, and Affiliates cover the costs associated with borrowing and exhibiting objects. Applicants must demonstrate that they can care for, protect, and exhibit Smithsonian collections on a long-term basis and that they are financially able to develop and maintain professional exhibitions.

While serving as an Affiliate, organizations must grant Smithsonian curators and personnel access to borrowed artifacts, provide the Smithsonian with reports needed to monitor the partnership, and operate in accordance with the policies of the Board of Regents.

Organizations apply by submitting documentation of their 501(c)(3) status, a mission statement, an organizational chart, an annual report, and a facilities report in the American Alliance of Museums format, together with a narrative describing the proposed partnership. Approved applicants sign a Smithsonian Affiliations Agreement and are assigned a National Outreach Manager to coordinate loans and projects, which are set for defined periods of time.

== Programs and professional development ==
Affiliate organizations take part in professional training, outreach, and programming initiatives coordinated by the Smithsonian Affiliations office.

- Smithsonian Affiliations National Conference: an annual conference at which staff of Affiliate organizations attend workshops, lectures, and training sessions led by Smithsonian, Affiliate, and museum-industry staff.
- Smithsonian Affiliations Visiting Professional Program: a program in which staff of Affiliate organizations receive training from Smithsonian staff while working in Washington, D.C.

== Educational collaborations ==
The Smithsonian Affiliations program develops collaborative educational programs in science, art, history, and culture.

- National Youth Summit: The 50th Anniversary of the Freedom Rides was an NEH-funded program featuring a panel of Freedom Riders at the National Museum of American History. The event was broadcast to five Affiliate sites, where students were able to question the panelists about their experiences as civil rights activists.
- Places of Invention: a collaboration between the Lemelson Center for the Study of Invention and Innovation (National Museum of American History) and Smithsonian Affiliations, supported by a grant from the National Science Foundation. Six Affiliate organizations conducted community research documenting their communities as "places of invention", with results intended for the Lemelson Center's exhibition of the same name scheduled to open in 2015.
- Youth Capture the Colorful Cosmos: a collaboration between Smithsonian Affiliations and the Harvard-Smithsonian Astrophysical Observatory in which students at thirteen Affiliate organizations control MicroObservatory robotic telescopes over the internet to capture astronomy images, some of which are used in astrophotography exhibitions of the students' work.
- Smithsonian Immigration/Migration Initiative: an initiative centered in the National Museum of American History and the Center for Folklife and Cultural Heritage, with eight Affiliate partners serving in an advisory group. The initiative examines how young members of immigrant communities in the United States can tell their own stories, and convenes representatives in Washington, D.C. to discuss programs and collections focused on immigration and migration.
- Spark!Lab Outreach Kit: traveling kits of hands-on invention activities created by the Lemelson Center for the Study of Invention and Innovation and sent to five Affiliate museums.
- Let's Do History Tour: a program in which educators from the National Museum of American History toured several cities to share teaching techniques, online tools, and educational content for K–12 teachers, with Affiliate organizations presenting local and collection-based resources for teaching American history.
- Universal Design Webinar: a collaboration between Smithsonian Affiliations, the American Alliance of Museums, and the Smithsonian Accessibility Program on universal design in museums, hosted at twenty-four Affiliate organizations and later published as an article in AAM's Museum magazine.

== List of Affiliates by state/country ==
The following is a list of current Smithsonian affiliates:

=== Alabama ===
- Anniston Museum of Natural History (Anniston)
- Birmingham Civil Rights Institute (Birmingham)
- U.S. Space and Rocket Center (Huntsville)

=== Alaska ===
- Anchorage Museum (Anchorage)

=== Arizona ===
- Bisbee Mining and Historical Museum (Bisbee)
- Musical Instrument Museum (Phoenix)
- Western Spirit Museum (Scottsdale)
- Arizona Historical Society (Tucson)
- Arizona State Museum (Tucson)
- Sigler Western Museum (Wickenburg)

=== Arkansas ===
- Historic Arkansas Museum (Little Rock)

=== California ===
- USS Hornet Sea, Air & Space Museum (Alameda)
- Cerritos Library (Cerritos)
- Columbia Memorial Space Center (Downey)
- Western Science Center (Hemet)
- Museum of Latin American Art (Long Beach)
- California African American Museum (Los Angeles)
- California Science Center (Los Angeles)
- Japanese American National Museum (Los Angeles)
- LA Plaza de Cultura y Artes (Los Angeles)
- Aerospace Museum of California (McClellan Park)
- Agua Caliente Cultural Museum (Palm Springs)
- Sam and Alfreda Maloof Foundation for Arts and Crafts (Rancho Cucamonga)
- California State Railroad Museum (Sacramento)
- Museum of Us (San Diego)
- San Diego Air and Space Museum (San Diego)
- San Diego History Center (San Diego)
- Aquarium of the Bay (San Francisco)
- Museum of the African Diaspora (San Francisco)
- Museum of Sonoma County (Santa Rosa)

=== Colorado ===
- University Corporation for Atmospheric Research (Boulder)
- University of Colorado Museum of Natural History (Boulder)
- Denver Botanic Gardens (Denver)
- History Colorado (Denver)
- Littleton Museum (Littleton)
- Pinhead Institute (Telluride)
- Telluride Historical Museum (Telluride)

=== Connecticut ===
- Connecticut Museum of Culture and History (Hartford)
- Mystic Seaport Museum (Mystic)

=== Delaware ===
- Hagley Museum and Library (Wilmington)

=== Florida ===
- The Bishop Museum of Science and Nature (Bradenton)
- The Cici and Hyatt Brown Museum of Art, Science & History (Daytona Beach)
- Ashley Gibson Barnett Museum of Art at Florida Southern College (Lakeland)
- Kennedy Space Center Visitor Complex (Merritt Island)
- Florida International University (Miami)
- Museum of Miami (Miami)
- Phillip and Patricia Frost Museum of Science (Miami)
- Orange County Regional History Center (Orlando)
- The Mennello Museum of American Art (Orlando)
- Marie Selby Botanical Gardens (Sarasota)
- St. Augustine Lighthouse & Maritime Museum (St. Augustine)
- Tampa Bay History Center (Tampa)

=== Georgia ===
- David J. Sencer CDC Museum (Atlanta)
- The Morris Museum of Art (Augusta)
- Booth Western Art Museum (Cartersville)
- Tellus Science Museum (Cartersville)
- Southern Museum of Civil War and Locomotive History (Kennesaw)
- Georgia's Old Governor's Mansion (Milledgeville)

=== Hawaii ===
- Lyman Museum and Mission House (Hilo)
- Pearl Harbor Aviation Museum (Honolulu)

=== Illinois ===
- Schingoethe Center of Aurora University (Aurora)
- Adler Planetarium (Chicago)
- DuSable Black History Museum and Education Center (Chicago)
- Northwest Territory Historic Center (Dixon)
- Lizzadro Museum of Lapidary Art (Oak Brook)
- Peoria Riverfront Museum (Peoria)
- Abraham Lincoln Presidential Library and Museum (Springfield)

=== Indiana ===
- Conner Prairie (Fishers)
- Indiana Historical Society (Indianapolis)

=== Iowa ===
- National Czech & Slovak Museum & Library (Cedar Rapids)
- The Putnam Museum & Science Center (Davenport)
- Dubuque Museum of Art (Dubuque)
- National Mississippi River Museum & Aquarium (Dubuque)
- Grinnell College (Grinnell)

=== Kansas ===
- Cosmosphere Inc. (Hutchinson)

=== Kentucky ===
- Kentucky Historical Society (Frankfort)
- International Museum of the Horse (Lexington)
- The Frazier History Museum (Louisville)

=== Louisiana ===
- National World War II Museum (New Orleans)
- Louisiana State Exhibit Museum (Shreveport)

=== Maryland ===
- Historic Annapolis (Annapolis)
- Dr. Samuel D. Harris National Museum of Dentistry (Baltimore)
- National Museum of Railroad History & Innovation (Baltimore)
- The Lewis (Baltimore)
- The Maryland-National Capital Park and Planning Commission (College Park)
- Annmarie Sculpture Garden and Arts Center (Solomons)

=== Massachusetts ===
- USS Constitution Museum (Boston)
- Framingham State University (Framingham)
- Plimoth Patuxet Museums (Plymouth)
- Springfield Museums (Springfield)

=== Michigan ===
- Michigan Flight Museum (Belleville)
- Arab American National Museum (Dearborn)
- Michigan Science Center (Detroit)
- Michigan State University Museum (East Lansing)
- Muskegon Museum of Art (Muskegon)
- Air Zoo (Portage)
- The Dennos Museum Center (Traverse City)

=== Minnesota ===
- Bell Museum - University of Minnesota (Saint Paul)

=== Mississippi ===
- Mississippi Department of Archives and History (Jackson)

=== Missouri ===
- American Jazz Museum (Kansas City)
- Union Station Kansas City, Inc. (Kansas City)
- Saint Louis Science Center (St. Louis)

=== Montana ===
- Museum of the Rockies (Bozeman)
- Montana Historical Society (Helena)

=== Nebraska ===
- Strategic Air Command & Aerospace Museum (Ashland)
- University of Nebraska State Museum (Lincoln)
- The Durham Museum (Omaha)

=== Nevada ===
- Atomic Museum (Las Vegas)
- Las Vegas Science and Natural History Museum (Las Vegas)

=== New Hampshire ===
- Strawbery Banke Museum (Portsmouth)

=== New Jersey ===
- Morris Museum (Morristown)

=== New Mexico ===
- New Mexico Museum of Space History (Alamogordo)
- National Hispanic Cultural Center (Albuquerque)
- National Museum of Nuclear Science & History (Albuquerque)
- New Mexico Museum of Natural History and Science (Albuquerque)
- City of Las Cruces Museum System (Las Cruces)

=== New York ===
- The Rockwell Museum (Corning)
- Flushing Council on Culture and the Arts (Flushing)
- Center for Jewish History (New York)
- City Lore (New York)
- Museum of American Finance (New York)
- National Jazz Museum in Harlem (New York)
- Snug Harbor Cultural Center and Botanical Garden (Staten Island)
- Long Island Museum (Stony Brook)
- The Wild Center (Tupper Lake)

=== North Carolina ===
- Charlotte Museum of History (Charlotte)
- Sullenberger Aviation Museum (Charlotte)
- Schiele Museum of Natural History (Gastonia)
- Greensboro History Museum (Greensboro)
- North Carolina Museum of History (Raleigh)
- North Carolina Museum of Natural Sciences (Raleigh)
- Cape Fear Museum of History and Science (Wilmington)

=== North Dakota ===
- Plains Art Museum (Fargo)

=== Ohio ===
- Cummings Center for the History of Psychology (Akron)
- Cincinnati Museum Center (Cincinnati)
- National Underground Railroad Freedom Center (Cincinnati)
- Taft Museum of Art (Cincinnati)
- Western Reserve Historical Society (Cleveland)
- Ohio History Connection (Columbus)
- The Works: Ohio Center for History, Art and Technology (Newark)
- Springfield Museum of Art (Springfield)

=== Oklahoma ===
- Oklahoma History Center Museum (Oklahoma City)
- Science Museum Oklahoma (Oklahoma City)
- Stafford Air & Space Museum (Weatherford)

=== Oregon ===
- High Desert Museum (Bend)
- Rice Northwest Museum of Rocks and Minerals (Hillsboro)
- North American Aerospace Museum (McMinnville)
- Japanese American Museum of Oregon (Portland)

=== Pennsylvania ===
- Historic Bethlehem Museums & Sites (Bethlehem)
- National Museum of Industrial History (Bethlehem)
- Mercer Museum & Fonthill Castle (Doylestown)
- Delaware & Lehigh National Heritage Corridor (Easton)
- The National Civil War Museum (Harrisburg)
- America's Transportation Experience (Hershey)
- African American Museum in Philadelphia (Philadelphia)
- Weitzman National Museum of American Jewish History (Philadelphia)
- Senator John Heinz History Center (Pittsburgh)
- Railroad Museum of Pennsylvania (Strasburg)

=== Puerto Rico ===
- Arecibo Observatory / Angel Ramos Foundation Science and Visitor Center (Arecibo)
- Universidad Ana G. Mendez (Gurabo)
- Museo de Arte de Puerto Rico (Santurce)

=== Rhode Island ===
- International Tennis Hall of Fame (Newport)
- Rhode Island Historical Society (Providence)

=== South Carolina ===
- South Carolina State Museum (Columbia)
- The Children's Museum of the Upstate (Greenville)
- Upcountry History Museum (Greenville)
- Coastal Discovery Museum (Hilton Head Island)
- York County Culture and Heritage Museums (Rock Hill)

=== South Dakota ===
- South Dakota State Historical Society (Pierre)
- National Music Museum (Vermillion)

=== Tennessee ===
- The Museum and Cultural Center at 5ive Points (Cleveland)
- Museum of Appalachia (Clinton)
- International Storytelling Center (Jonesborough)
- McClung Museum of Natural History and Culture (Knoxville)
- Memphis Rock 'N' Soul Museum (Memphis)
- National Civil Rights Museum (Memphis)
- American Museum of Science and Energy (Oak Ridge)

=== Texas ===
- City of Austin Art, Music, Culture and Entertainment (Austin)
- Frontiers of Flight Museum (Dallas)
- Perot Museum of Nature and Science (Dallas)
- Fort Worth Museum of Science and History (Fort Worth)
- National Museum of the Pacific War (Fredericksburg)
- Space Center Houston (Houston)
- The Health Museum (Houston)
- City of Irving Department of Arts & Culture (Irving)
- International Museum of Art and Science (McAllen)
- Ellen Noël Art Museum (Odessa)
- The Witte Museum (San Antonio)
- UTSA-Institute of Texan Cultures (San Antonio)
- Mayborn Museum Complex (Waco)

=== Utah ===
- Park City Museum (Park City)

=== Vermont ===
- Sullivan Museum and History Center (Northfield)

=== Virginia ===
- Birthplace of Country Music (Bristol)
- Virginia Museum of Natural History (Martinsville)
- Hermitage Museum & Gardens (Norfolk)

=== Washington ===
- Whatcom Museum (Bellingham)
- Burke Museum of Natural History and Culture (Seattle)
- Museum of History & Industry (Seattle)
- The Museum of Flight (Seattle)
- Wing Luke Museum (Seattle)
- Northwest Museum of Arts and Culture (Spokane)

=== West Virginia ===
- Heritage Farm Museum and Village (Huntington)

=== Wisconsin ===
- Kenosha Public Museums (Kenosha)
- Wisconsin Veterans Museum (Madison)

=== Wyoming ===
- Buffalo Bill Center of the West (Cody)
- Heart Mountain Wyoming Foundation (Powell)

=== Panama ===
- Biomuseo (Panama City)
- Museo del Canal Interoceánico de Panamá (Panama City)

== Loans and exhibitions ==
The following are examples of artifacts, works of art, and scientific specimens that the Smithsonian Institution has loaned to Smithsonian Affiliate organizations.

The National Museum of American History has been among the most active lenders. It sent the Pioneer (locomotive), a Civil War-era engine, to the B&O Railroad Museum in Baltimore, Maryland for the exhibit The War Came by Train. Its loans have ranged widely in subject: Kermit the Frog traveled to the National Mississippi River Museum and Aquarium in Dubuque, Iowa for Toadally Frogs!, while the top hat worn by President Abraham Lincoln on the night of his assassination went to the Blackhawk Museum in Danville, California. The Senator John Heinz History Center in Pittsburgh, Pennsylvania, holds a Bantam Jeep and a piece of the original Star Spangled Banner Flag on loan from the museum.

The National Museum of Natural History has likewise lent objects across the country. Pieces from its Bisbee Mineral Collection appeared in Digging In: Bisbee's Mineral Heritage at the Bisbee Mining and Historical Museum in Bisbee, Arizona, and the Smithsonian Community Reef—thousands of crocheted reef forms originally part of the Sant Ocean Hall exhibit—was sent to the Putnam Museum and IMAX Theatre in Davenport, Iowa. Among its more unusual loans are the skeleton of the racehorse "Lexington", displayed at the International Museum of the Horse in Lexington, Kentucky, and an 18-karat gold Monopoly set designed by artist Sidney Mobell, lent to the Museum of American Finance in New York, New York. The museum also provided "The Peoria Falcon", a sheet of copper stylized in the form of a falcon during the Mississippian Period and excavated near Peoria in the late 1850s, to the Lakeview Museum of Arts and Sciences (now Peoria Riverfront Museum) in Peoria, Illinois. For the exhibit Smithsonian Expeditions: Exploring Latin American and the Caribbean at the Miami Museum of Science, it lent several items, including painted gourds and a 5-foot-tall monolith from the Nicaraguan island of Momotombito.

From the Smithsonian American Art Museum, Thomas Moran's painting The Grand Canyon of the Yellowstone was shown at the Buffalo Bill Historical Center in Cody, Wyoming from June 1 to October 31, 2009, and three José Campeche paintings were lent to the Museo de Arte de Puerto Rico in San Juan, Puerto Rico.

The National Postal Museum contributed a Railway Post Office to the North Carolina Transportation Museum in Spencer, North Carolina, as well as stamp designs and drawings created by President Franklin D. Roosevelt, which went to the Blackhawk Museum in Danville, California.

Several other Smithsonian units have lent works as well. More than 20 sculptures from the Hirshhorn Museum and Sculpture Garden are on display at the Annmarie Sculpture Garden in Solomons, Maryland, and Yokohama prints from the Freer Gallery of Art and the Arthur M. Sackler Gallery appeared in Japan After Perry: Views of Yokohama and Meiji Japan at the Japanese American National Museum in Los Angeles, California. The Historic Arkansas Museum drew on the National Museum of the American Indian for more than 40 artifacts shown in We Walk in Two Worlds: The Caddo, Osage and Quapaw in Arkansas.

Some affiliates have borrowed large groups of objects at once. The Kansas Cosmosphere and Space Center in Hutchinson, Kansas received over 140 space objects, among them the original Apollo 13 command module and the space suit worn by commanding astronaut James Lovell. The Durham Museum in Omaha, Nebraska borrowed 174 artifacts for American Originals: Collections from the Smithsonian, including the jacket Bob Keeshan wore while filming the children's television series Captain Kangaroo, a three-wheel Westcoaster Mailster used by the United States Postal Service in the 1960s, and oil paintings of U.S. Supreme Court Justice Thurgood Marshall and Seneca Chief Red Jacket.
