= Freakybuttrue Peculiarium =

Shop and museum in Oregon, US

- Logo

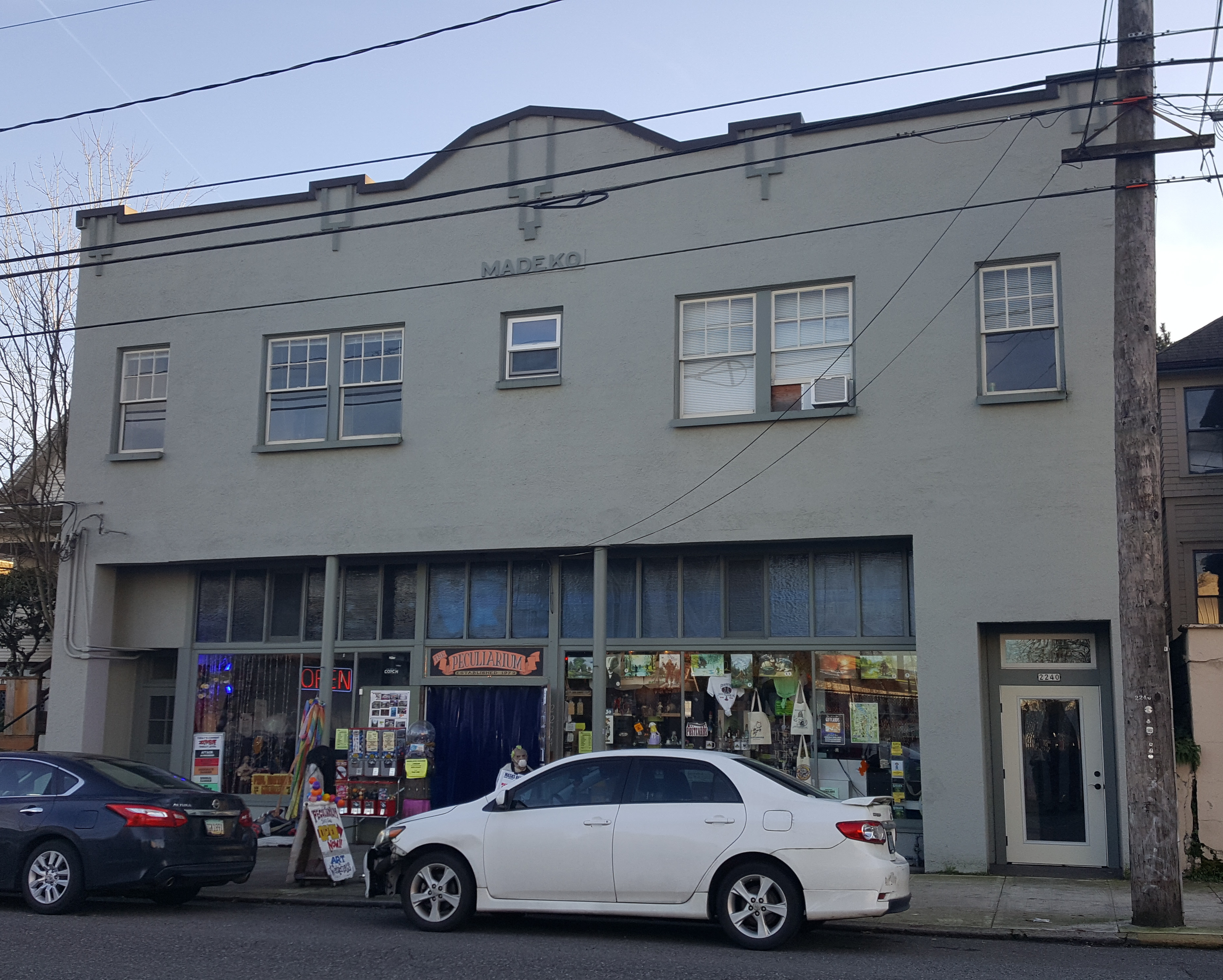
- The museum's exterior in 2022
- Location: Portland, Oregon, U.S.
- Coordinates: 45.5354°N 122.6975°W
- Website: peculiarium.com

The Freakybuttrue Peculiarium is a shop and museum in Portland, Oregon, United States.

== Description ==
The museum operates in northwest Portland. It has a ten-foot-tall statue of Bigfoot.

== History ==
In late 2019, the museum announced plans to expand and relocate.

David Byrne visited the museum in 2026.

== Reception ==
The Freakybuttrue Peculiarium was a finalist in the Best Museum category of Willamette Week's annual 'Best of Portland' readers' poll in 2025.

== See also ==
- Culture of Portland, Oregon
- List of museums in Portland, Oregon
- Tourism in Portland, Oregon
