= Geduld =

Geduld is a surname. Notable people with the name include:

- Harry M. Geduld (1931–2016), British American film and entertainment historian
- Jarrid Geduld (born 1990), South African actor
- Justin Geduld (born 1993), South African rugby player

== See also ==
- Herzog Heine Geduld, Inc., American market maker in NASDAQ and OTC securities
- Geduld (House of Assembly of South Africa constituency)
