= Lizzadro Museum of Lapidary Art =

Art museum in Illinois, US

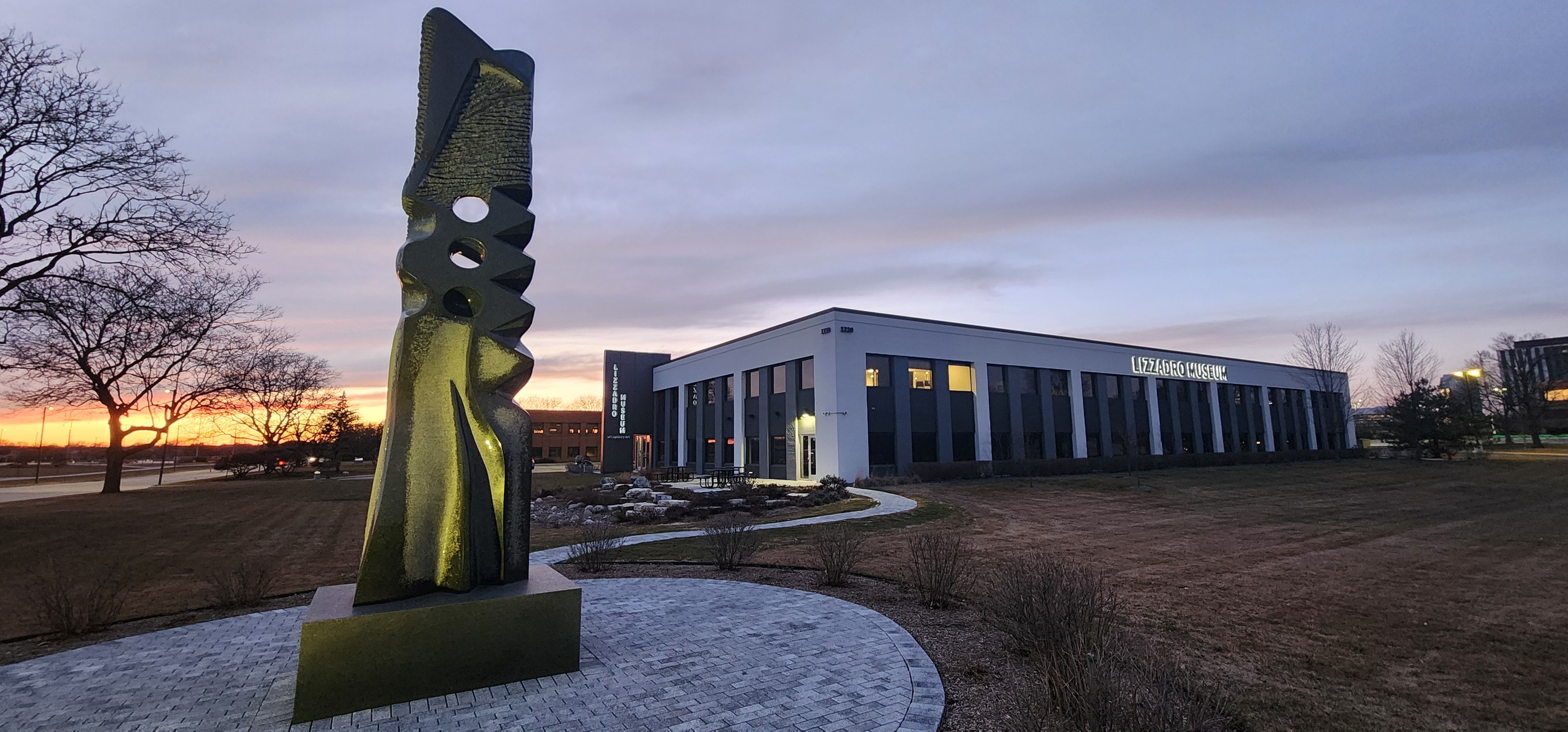
- Lizzadro Museum of Lapidary Art in Oak Brook, Illinois, showing the 2002 "Totem" sculpture by Robert Winslow
- Established: November 4, 1962
- Location: Oak Brook, Illinois, US
- Coordinates: 41°50′31″N 87°57′00″W
- Type: Science museum, art museum
- Website: lizzadromuseum.org

The Lizzadro Museum of Lapidary Art is a museum dedicated to the lapidary arts with displays of gemstones, jewelry and bejeweled objects, and exhibits on earth science. The museum was founded in Elmhurst, Illinois, United States, in 1962, and moved to Oak Brook, Illinois, in 2019.

== History ==
The Lizzadro Museum of Lapidary Art was opened on November 4, 1962. The museum was founded by Joseph Lizzadro, an Italian immigrant to the United States who began collecting jades as part of his interest in cutting and polishing precious stones for jewelry. His collection came to include pieces made of amber, ivory, coral, agate, and other gemstones. As his collection grew, he made an agreement with the city of Elmhurst, Illinois, and the Elmhurst Park District to open a museum in the city's Wilder Park.

The Lizzadro Museum of Lapidary Art is a Smithsonian affiliate. It has curated several exhibitions of jewelry from the Smithsonian's collections.

In 2017, the museum made plans to move from Elmhurst to a new building in Oak Brook, Illinois, to gain space and provide more modern amenities to visitors. This move occurred in November of 2019, but, due to the COVID-19 pandemic, it was closed to the public for most of 2020.

== Collections ==
The lapidary arts form the core of the Lizzadro Museum's collections, particularly jade carvings including the Altar of the Green Jade Pagoda by Chang Wen-Ti. However, the museum also displays a selection of uncarved gemstones, fossils, and other minerals, as well as sculptures, mosaics, dioramas, and a miniature castle made of carved stone and gold called "Castle Lizzadro" by William Tolliday.
