= Mei Sum Bakery =

Cantonese bakery in Portland, Oregon, U.S.

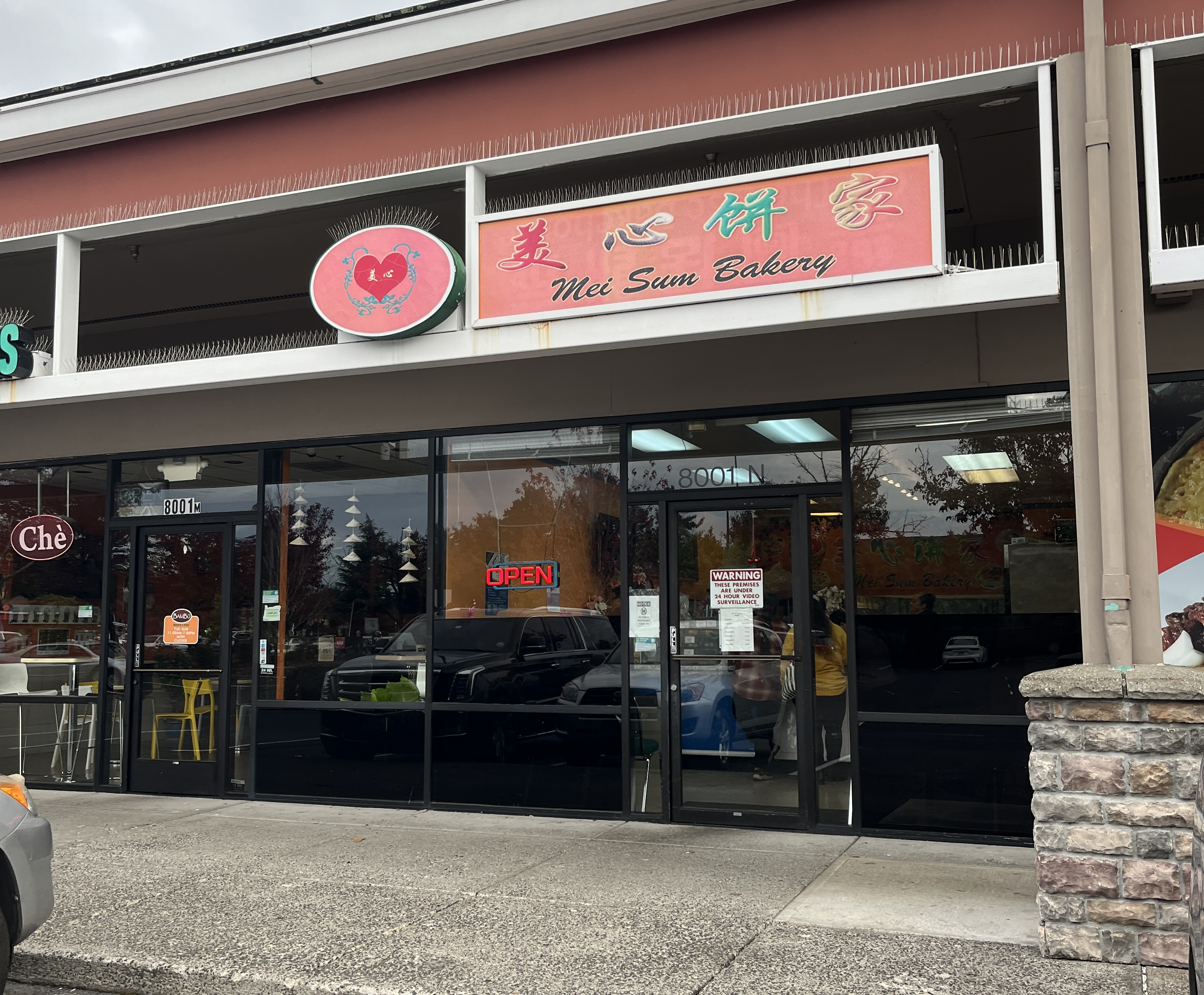
- The bakery's exterior, 2024
- Interactive map of Mei Sum Bakery

Restaurant information
- Food type: Cantonese
- Location: 8001 Southeast Powell Boulevard, Suite N, Portland, Multnomah, Oregon, 97206, United States
- Coordinates: 45.4989°N 122.5795°W

Mei Sum Bakery is an Asian Pacific American-owned Cantonese bakery in Portland, Oregon's Jade District. Operating in southeast Portland's South Tabor neighborhood as one of the city's few Chinese bakeries, Mei Sum serves baozi, mooncakes, pastries, sponge cakes, tarts, and other baked goods. The bakery has garnered a generally positive reception. Select Mei Sum products are available at the teahouse at Lan Su Chinese Garden.

== Description ==
The Asian Pacific American-owned Cantonese bakery Mei Sum operates on Powell Boulevard in southeast Portland's South Tabor neighborhood. It is one of the city's few Chinese bakeries, operating within the Jade District, an Asian-dominated commercial area along 82nd Avenue. Matthew Korfhage of Willamette Week has described the bakery as "cramped and friendly", with a large banner that "makes you feel like you've walked in on a surprise party every time you go".

The menu has a variety of baozi (including cha siu bao, corn sausage, hot dogs and cheese, pineapple buns, and pineapple taro), as well as pastries with pork, sponge cakes, and tarts such as custard tarts and egg tarts. Mei Sum has served both baked and steamed pork buns, a green onion bun with ham and mayonnaise, cupcakes, mochi balls with coconut, and cream-filled sweet flower cake. Korfhage described sponge cakes decorated with flowers and rabbits sculpted from icing. Breakfast-oriented buns have egg, ham, and cheese. The bakery also serves mooncakes with two or four yolks.

== History ==
In 2021, Mei Sum participated in the Around the World in 82 Dishes, a food competition organized by the 82nd Avenue Business District for businesses along 82nd Avenue. Mei Sum's baked goods became available at Yun Shui, the teahouse at Lan Su Chinese Garden, in 2024.

== Reception ==
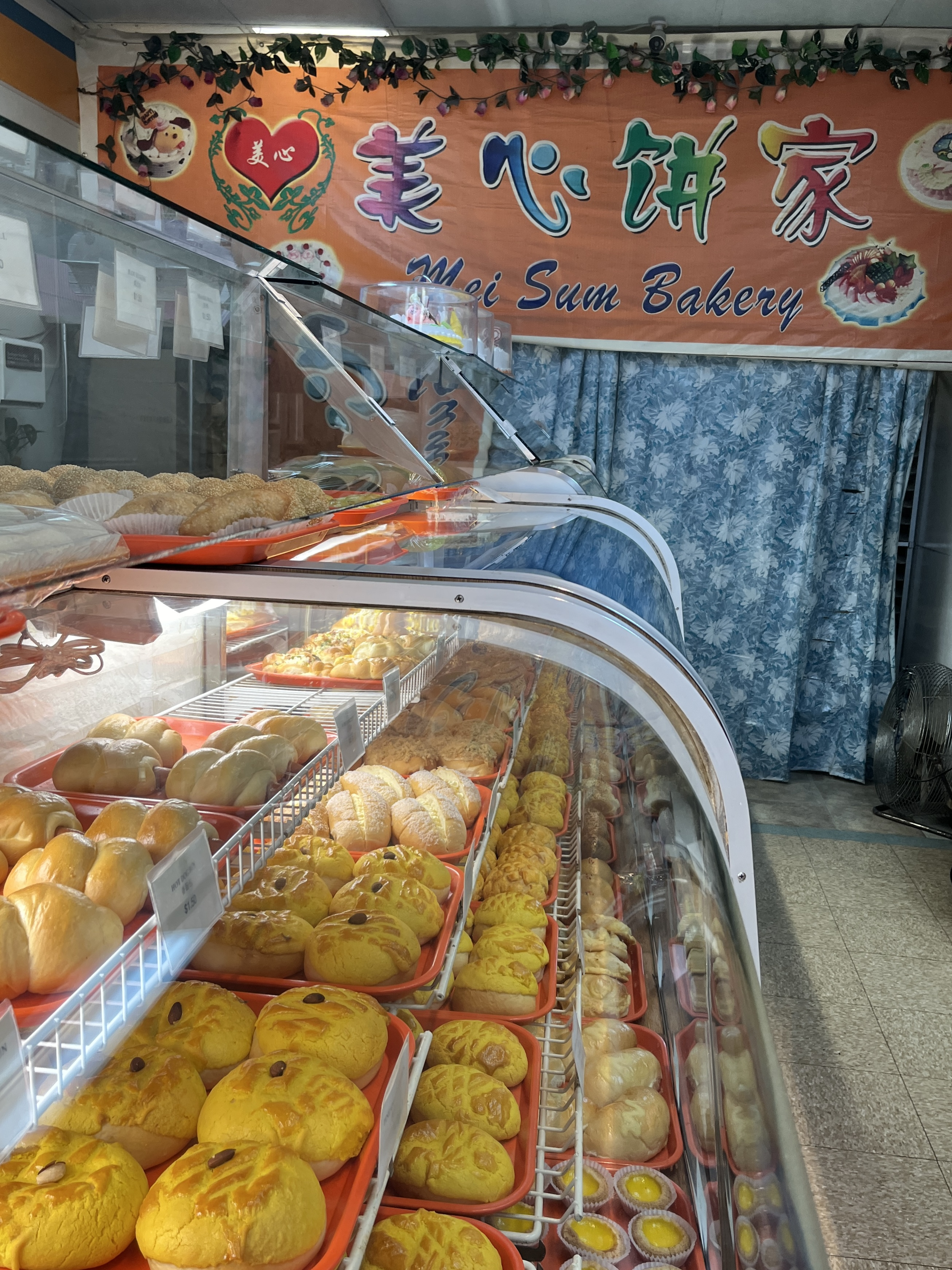
The bakery's interior, 2024

Portland Monthly says, "Not all flavors are amazing, but Mei Sum has some delights." In 2011, local chef Andy Ricker said the pineapple roll, egg and ham roll, green onion and bacon roll, cream roll, and egg tarts "are all really good and dirt cheap". He said the milk tea is good and inexpensive, and wrote: "Old Chinese guys hang out there in the morning to drink tea, smoke and talk shit." The Oregonian's Adam Levbarg said of the mooncakes in 2019:

Mei Sum's thin pastry layer was tender and ever-so-slightly crumbly— imagine a thick Red Bean Newton. The filling had a pleasingly smooth, creamy texture with a subtly roasted, nutty flavor. The lotus paste mooncake was rather sweet without much dimension, other than the punch of peanut powder. What transformed the experience was the deep, golden salted duck yolk, which added an almost cheese-like, salty savoriness, punching up the muted complexity of the red bean.

In her 2024 list of eighteen "knockout" eateries for affordable dining in the city, Eater Portland's Katrina Yentch called Mei Sum "an under-sung gem" and said, "It's also a smart stop to make on a birthday, with whole rolled sponge cakes rarely exceeding $10." Mei Sum was also included in the website's 2025 list of Portland's best affordable restaurants.

== See also ==
- History of Chinese Americans in Portland, Oregon
- List of bakeries
- List of Chinese restaurants
