= William F. Eisner Museum of Advertising & Design =

Museum in Milwaukee, Wisconsin

Coordinates: 43°01′58.1″N 87°54′32.0″W

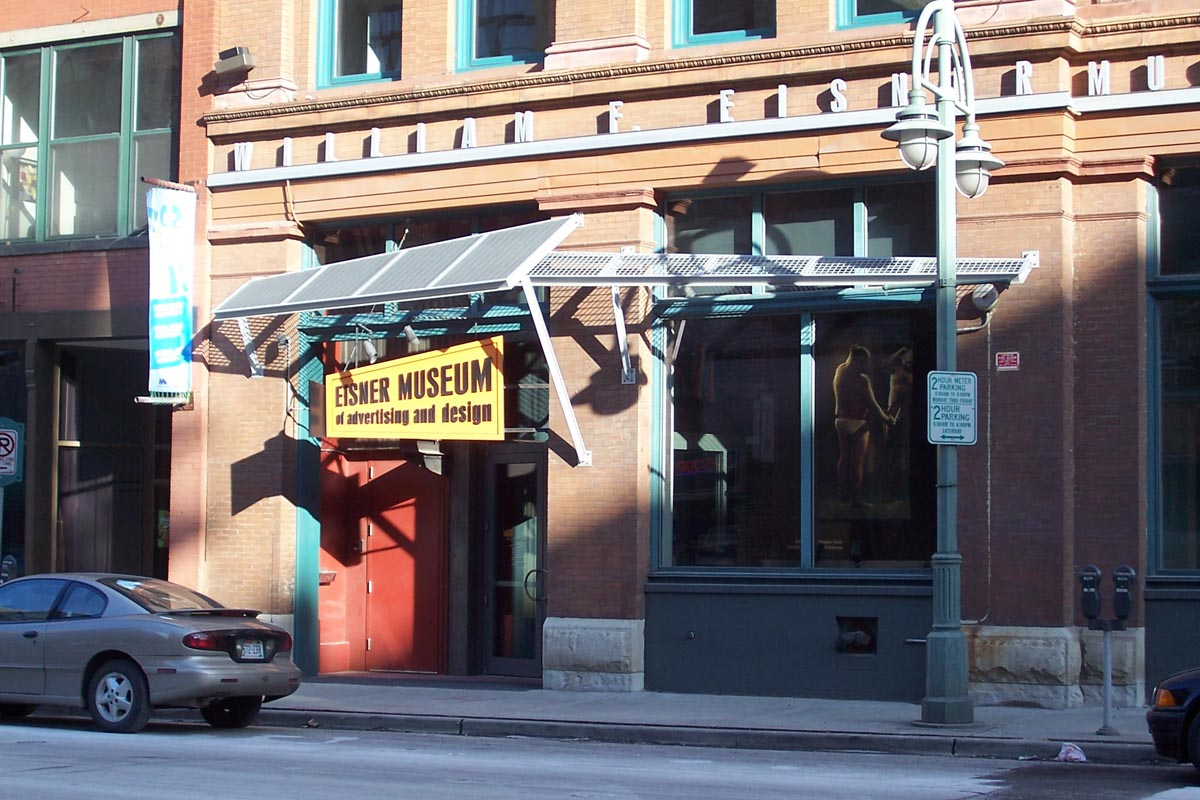
William F. Eisner Museum of Advertising & Design

The William F. Eisner Museum of Advertising & Design, or The Eisner, was an advertising museum located in Historic Third Ward in Milwaukee, Wisconsin in the United States.

== History ==
The museum was housed in an historic Renaissance Revival style building that was designed by architects Crane & Barkhausen and built in 1895. Opened in 2000, it was dedicated to William F. Eisner, a prolific 20th century designer and advertising entrepreneur. William's wife Elaine approached the Milwaukee Institute of Art & Design (MIAD) with the concept after his death in 1990.

Around February 2004, the Eisner Museum acquired the collections of the American Advertising Museum of Portland, Oregon in exchange for paying its debts.

The museum closed in 2010 when the building it was located in was sold. As of 2015, the disposition of the museum's collection and archives is currently under the charge of Debra Eisner Hackbarth. Serious inquiries regarding the future home of the collection or specific exhibits can be made directly to Debra.

== Legacy ==
Exhibits examined the impact of modern advertising and design on the social, historical and aesthetic aspects of American culture. Past exhibits included the legendary Burma-Shave roadway billboards, industrial design pioneer Brooks Stevens, and 100 years of Harley-Davidson advertising.

Exhibits available on the World Wide Web have explored some of the more memorable forms of advertising and design, such as the illustration work of Boris Artzybasheff and The Art of the Album Cover.
