= Museum of American Finance =

Museum in Boston

- Established: 1988 (as the Museum of American Financial History)
- Type: Finance museum; Smithsonian Institution affiliate
- Website: www.moaf.org

The Museum of American Finance is an independent public museum dedicated to preserving, exhibiting and teaching about American finance and financial history. It is an affiliate of the Smithsonian Institution. Until 2017 it was located in the Financial District in Manhattan, New York City, but in April 2025 it announced a relocation to Boston, Massachusetts, opening July 3, 2026.

== History and location ==
In 1987, John E. Herzog, then CEO of Herzog Heine Geduld, Inc., established the museum as the Museum of American Financial History in response to the stock market crash of that year. He provided the bulk of the institution's early leadership and was chairman and trustee emeritus as of 2012.

The museum opened in 1988 or 1989 and was renamed the Museum of American Finance in 2005. Until December 2006, it was located at 26 Broadway. On January 11, 2008, the museum opened in a new location at 48 Wall Street, the former headquarters of the Bank of New York. In 2018, their building experienced a flood and they remained in search of a permanent home until 2025.

In April 2025, the museum announced it would relocate and be a part of Boston's Seaport redevelopment. The museum opened July 3, 2026. Admission is free. The museum focuses on Boston's role in the country's financial history and showcases Boston-related items from its collections.

=== Collections and exhibitions ===
The museum collects documents and artifacts related to capital markets, money, and banking. Its collection includes more than 10,000 share certificates, bonds, prints, engravings, photographs, bank notes, checks and books.

Permanent exhibitions focus on the financial markets, money, banking, entrepreneurship and Alexander Hamilton. Temporary exhibitions have included "Barings in America: An Interactive Investment Experience" (December 2012 – April 2013), "Checks & Balances: Presidents and American Finance" (November 2011 – March 2013), "Tracking the Credit Crisis" (ongoing since 2009); "Alexander Hamilton: Lineage and Legacy" (April 2011 – March 2012); "Scandal! Financial Crime Chicanery and Corruption That Rocked America" (2010–11) and "Women of Wall Street" (2009–10).

Their collections were not harmed in the flood that closed the museum's Wall Street location in 2018. The Boston location provides their first permanent exhibition space since 2018.

== Programs and events ==
Speakers from across the financial industry participate in the museum's Financial History and Practices Lecture/Symposia Series, with subject matter ranging from discussions of current financial practices to observations on significant events and individuals in America's financial history. Speakers have included John Bogle, Sallie Krawcheck, David Walker, Abby Joseph Cohen, Henry Kaufman, Niall Ferguson and Neil Barofsky.

Other programs include the Lunch and Learn Series, which features talks, demonstrations and presentations during lunchtime, as well as walking tours and film screenings. The museum's annual gala honors an individual with the Whitehead Award for Distinguished Public Service and Financial Leadership, which is named after former Deputy Secretary of State and co-chair of Goldman Sachs John C. Whitehead. Honorees have included Paul Volcker, Pete Peterson, William Donaldson, Felix Rohatyn and William Harrison Jr.

Since 2012, the museum has partnered with the Alexander Hamilton Awareness Society co-hosting several events of the yearly CelebrateHAMILTON and Happy Birthday Hamilton! programs in July and January. Events included "The Essence of Alexander Hamilton's Greatness" by AHA Society founder, Rand Scholet, Hamilton vs. Jefferson historical interpreters "Debate", "Conversation with the Curators" with John Herzog, founder of the Museum of American Finance and Mariana Oller, Chair of the Alexander Hamilton Awareness Society on the process of collecting original Hamilton documents and then creating the "Alexander Hamilton: Indispensable Founder and Visionary" exhibit with them, the "New Discoveries in the life of Alexander Hamilton" Talk by Author and Historian Michael E. Newton, and the presentation of his new book "Alexander Hamilton – The Formative Years".

== Publications ==
The museum also regularly publishes on subjects pertaining to the history of finance. Its quarterly magazine, Financial History, reaches members in 50 US states and 20 other countries. The magazine publishes vetted articles by financial historians and journalists on historically significant events and individuals and other related topics in the world of finance. In 2011, the museum commemorated the 100th issue of Financial History with a Spring–Summer double edition. The museum also publishes books and catalogs including, most recently, The Revolutionary Beginning of the American Stock Market, which features many of the documents in the "America's First IPO" exhibit.

== Gallery ==
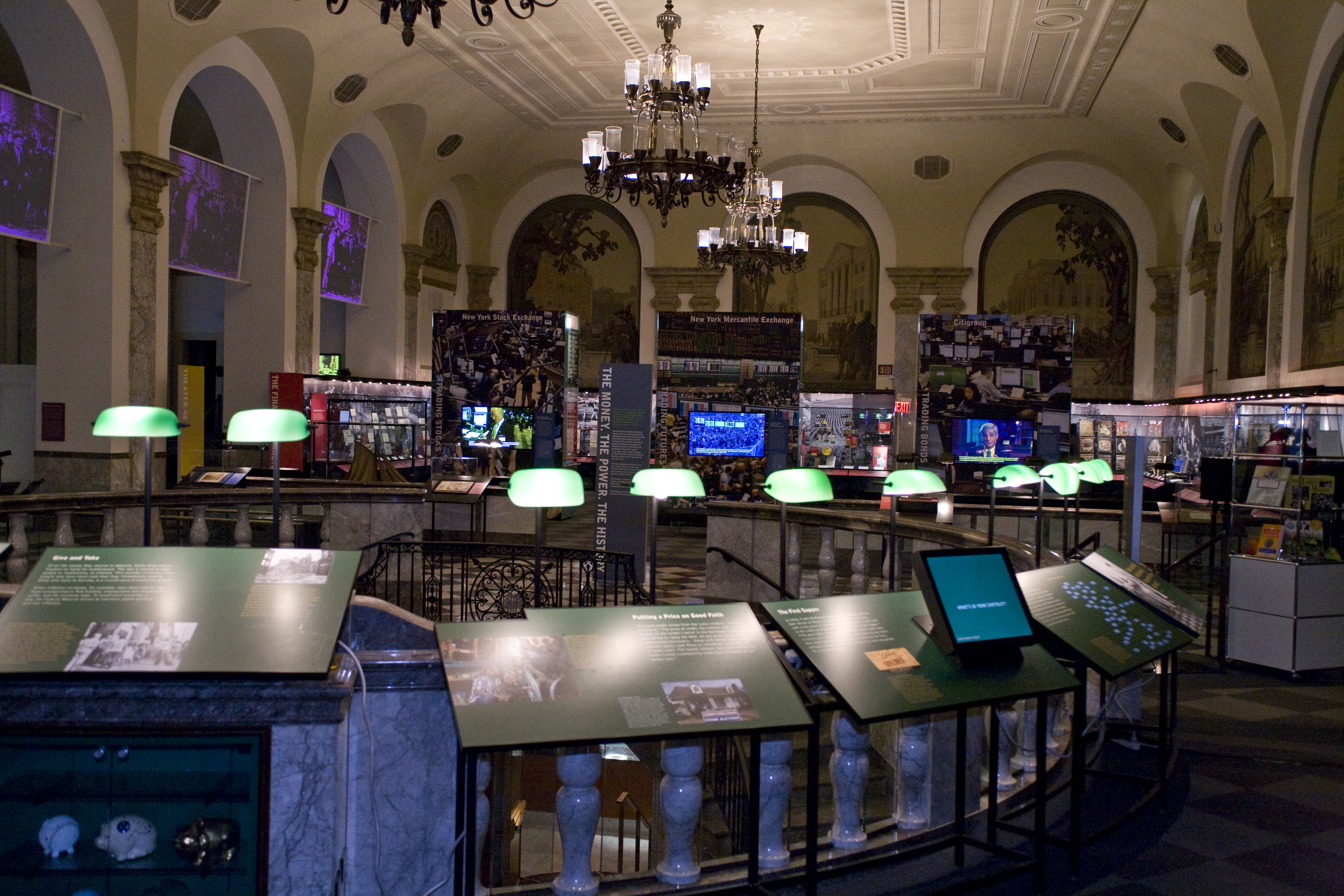
Main gallery

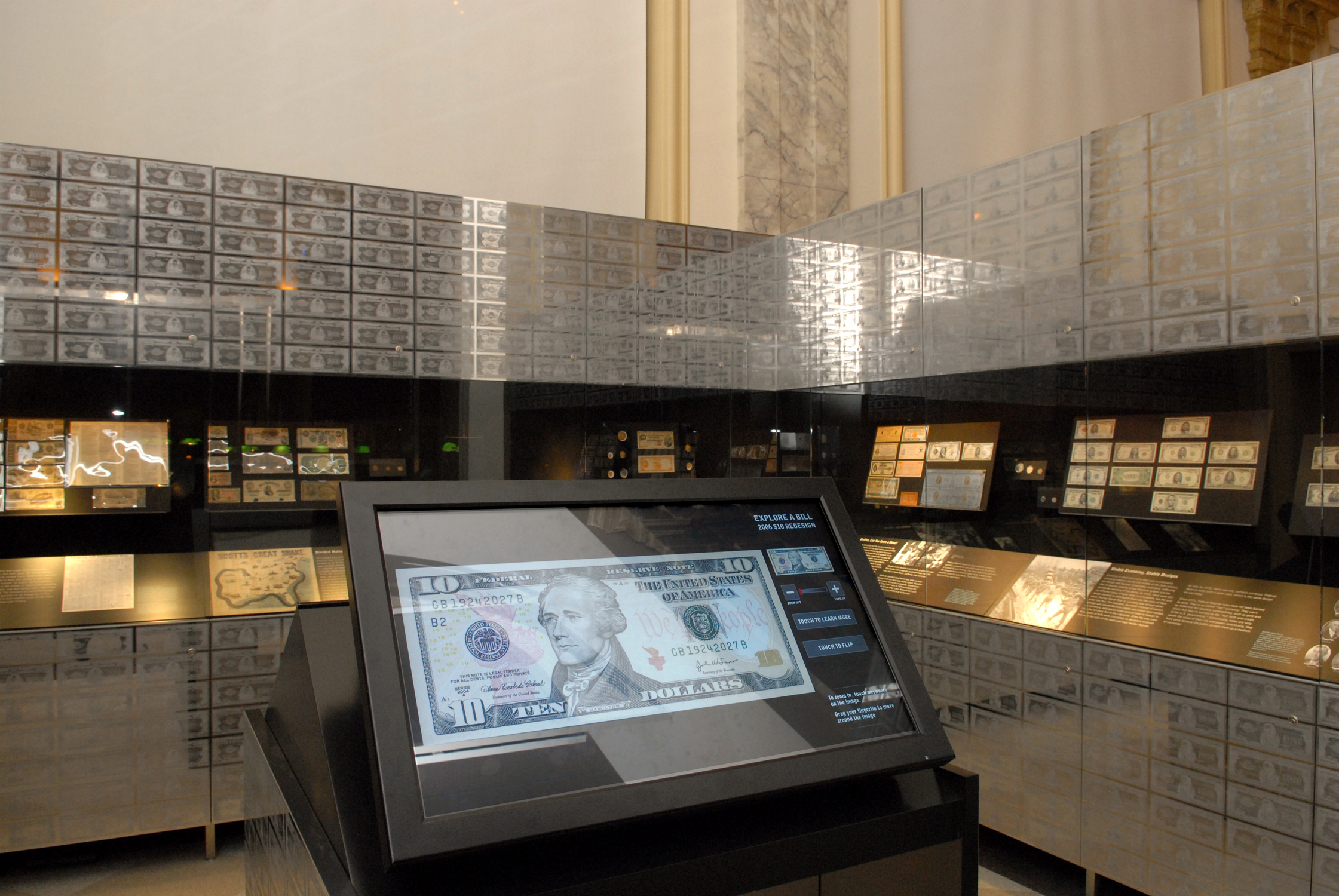
Money gallery

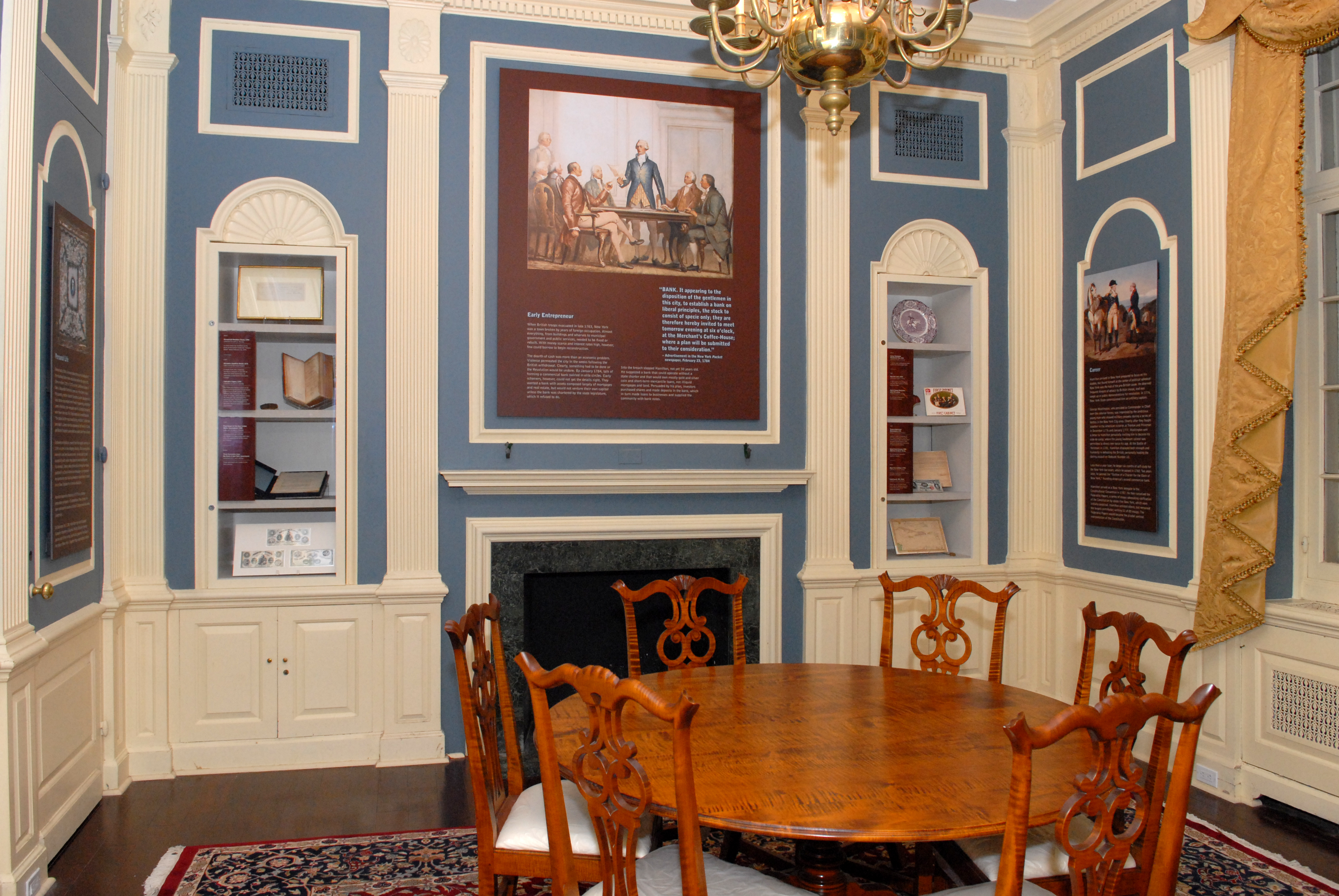
Hamilton Room

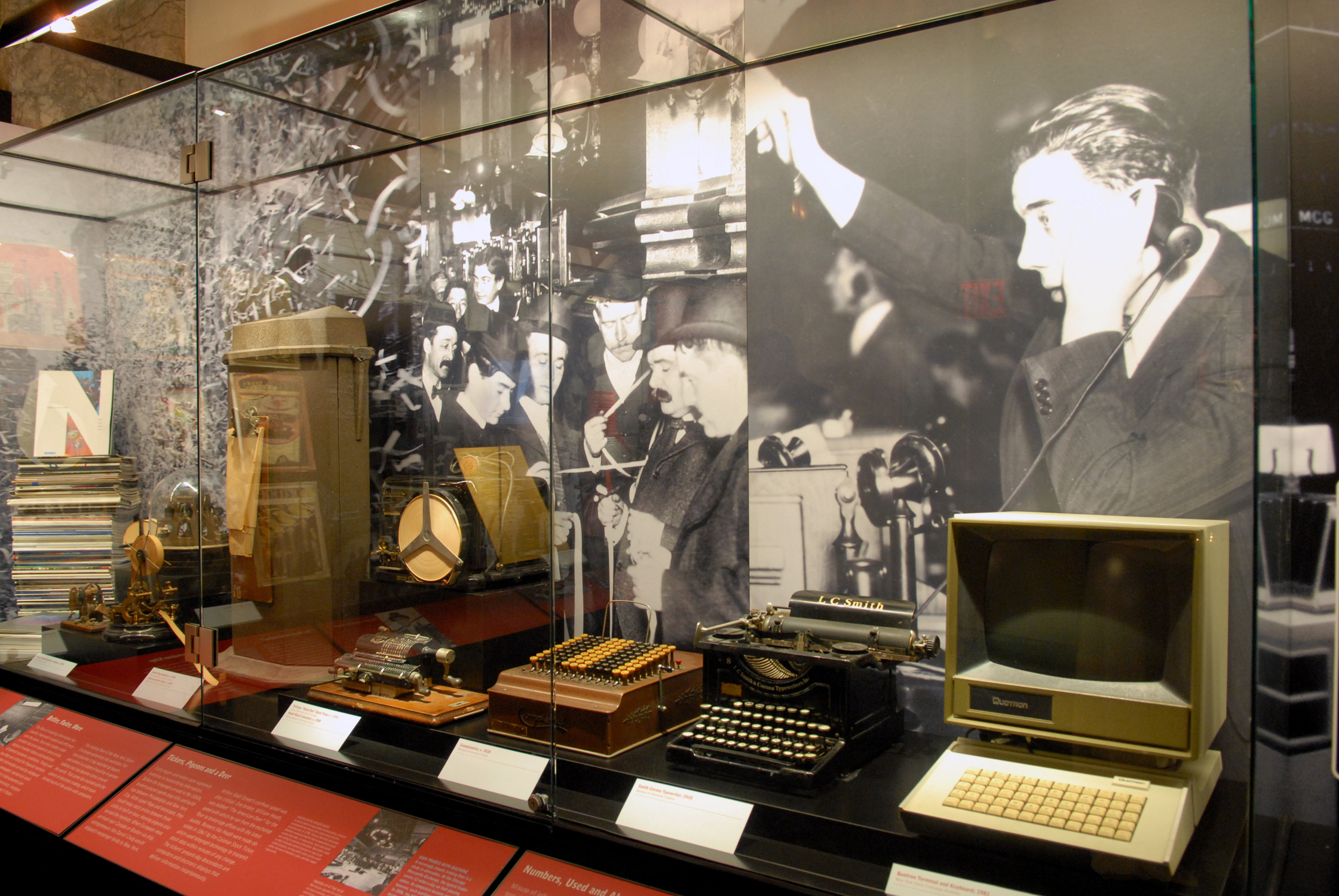
Information section
