= 3D Center of Art and Photography =

American nonprofit institution

- Location within Portland, Oregon
- Established: 1964
- Location: Portland, Oregon, United States
- Coordinates: 45.52991°N 122.691201°W
- Type: private: stereoscopy

The 3D Center of Art and Photography was an American nonprofit educational institution in Portland, Oregon that opened in 2003. It was the first museum in the United States dedicated to stereoscopy. From 2003 to 2011, the Center was located in a small leased storefront on NW Lovejoy Street that presented exhibits open to the public.

== Programs ==
The 3D Center collected historic and contemporary stereoscopic imagery and equipment. Its public exhibition space presented daily 3D slide shows, interactive displays, varying featured artists, display cabinets of antique 3D equipment and paraphernalia, and a gift shop full of 3D items. A 3-D viewing screen in the museum's collection was featured in the fifth season of the PBS television program History Detectives. The Center is "committed to presenting the best new work by contemporary artists working in 3D imagery, both nationally and internationally." It offered classes and workshops in stereoscopic techniques.

== History ==
The 3D Center was founded by members of Cascade Stereoscopic Club (CSC). In 2001, the CSC Board announced the intention to create a national 3D museum and learning center in Portland. It was conceived as a museum and gallery to house 3D equipment and imagery, a public place to teach classes, do workshops, have exhibitions, and a place to preserve historic stereoscopic images and equipment. The museum opened to the public in February 2004, housing an extensive collection of stereoscopic artifacts, including antique stereo cards, cameras and viewers. It closed to the public on December 31, 2011, due to poor economic conditions and increased rent on its leased premises.

== See also ==
- Culture of Portland, Oregon
