= Lan Su Chinese Garden =

Chinese garden in Portland, Oregon, U.S.

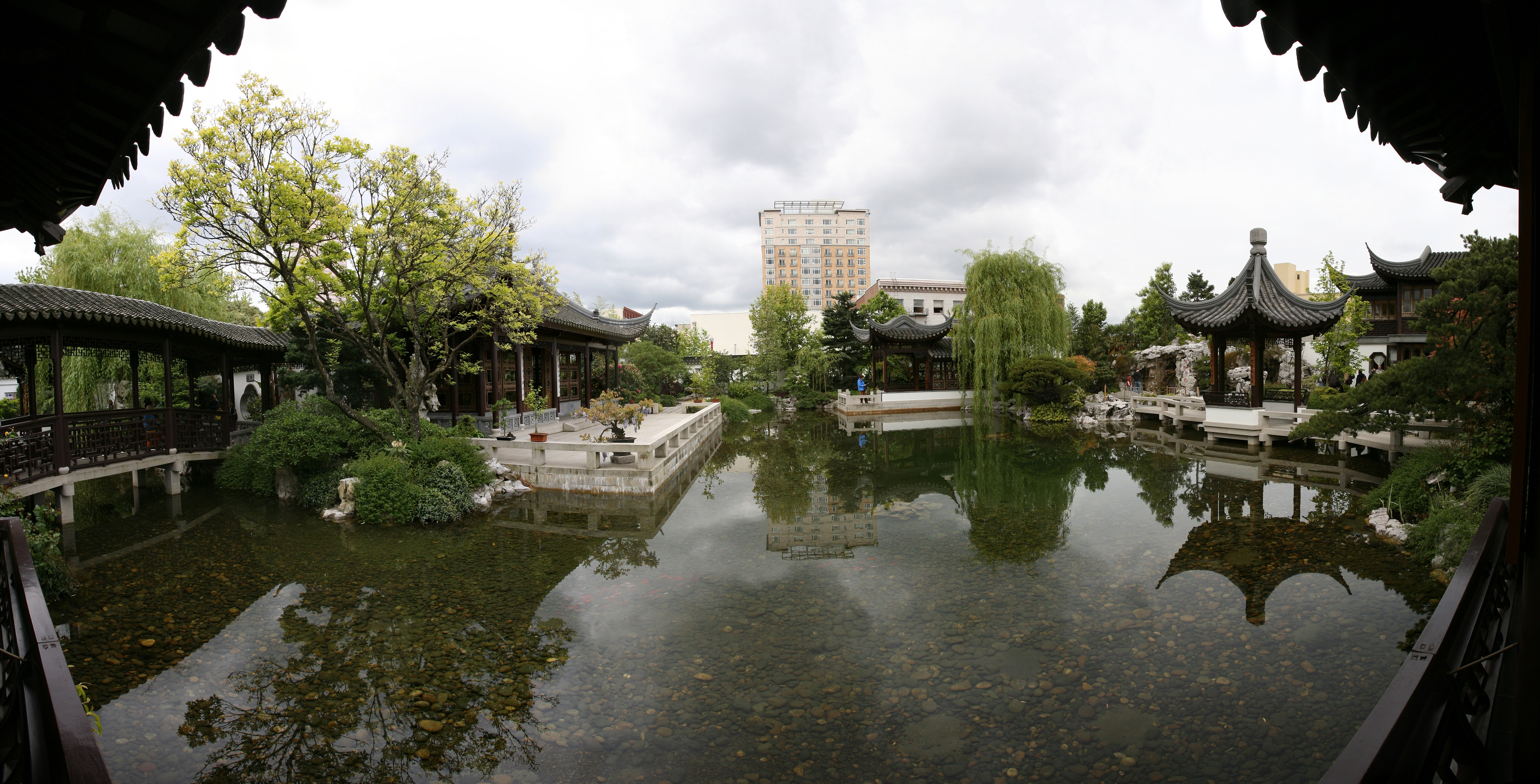
- Lake Zither at the center of the garden

- Location within Portland, Oregon Location within Oregon Location within the United States
- Type: Chinese garden
- Location: Portland, Oregon, United States
- Coordinates: 45.52565°N 122.67299°W
- Area: 40,000 sq ft (4,000 m^{2})
- Opened: 2000
- Public transit: Old Town/Chinatown
- Website: lansugarden.org

Lan Su Chinese Garden (simplified Chinese: 兰苏园; traditional Chinese: 蘭蘇園; pinyin: Lán Sū Yuán; Jyutping: Laan^{4} Sou^{1} Jyun^{4}), formerly the Portland Classical Chinese Garden and titled the Garden of Awakening Orchids, is a walled Chinese garden enclosing a full city block, roughly 40,000 square feet (4,000 m^{2}) in the Chinatown area of the Old Town Chinatown neighborhood of Portland, Oregon, United States. The garden is influenced by many of the famous classical gardens in Suzhou.

== History ==
In the early 1980s an effort was started to build a Chinese garden in Portland, and in 1988 Suzhou and Portland became sister cities. Portland mayor Vera Katz continued those efforts in the 1990s and assisted the non-profit group that operates the garden in finding a site for the project. The garden was designed by Kuang Zhen and built by 65 artisans from Suzhou on land donated by NW Natural on a 99-year lease; groundbreaking occurred in July 1999, and construction was completed 14 months later at a cost of about $12.8 million. Five hundred tons of rock, including Chinese scholar's rocks from Lake Tai (Taihu stone), were brought from China. The garden's grand opening was on September 14, 2000. The construction of the central lake has created problems at times, such as leakage and one case of three visitors falling into it.

=== Name Origin ===
Originally named Portland’s Classical Chinese Garden, it was renamed Lan Su Chinese Garden in January 2010 in celebration of the garden’s tenth anniversary. The name derives from the combination of the characters Lan, from the Chinese translation of Portland, and Su, from Suzhou, and is a representation of both cities being present in the garden. The character for Lan (simplified Chinese 兰 / traditional Chinese 蘭) also means orchid, and the character for Su (simplified Chinese 苏 / traditional Chinese 蘇) also means to awaken, so one can also translate the name as Garden of Awakening Orchids.

=== Current Events ===
In 2024 Portland city officials erected a security fence around the Lan Su Chinese Garden to stop repeated vandalism and hate crimes. Incidents included an axe being thrown through one of the tea house windows, the smearing of feces on a door, people engaging in drug use in view of the gardens, racist pamphlets, and their welcome sign being struck with a bottle full of red paint which have caused some employees to quit. These as well as the COVID-19 pandemic have also affected tourism with the garden losing about 50,000 visitors per year from the time the pandemic hit. As stated by Elizabeth Nye, who is the current Garden Director, there has been around a 10% decline in visitors from 2023 to 2024.

== Features ==
=== Plants ===
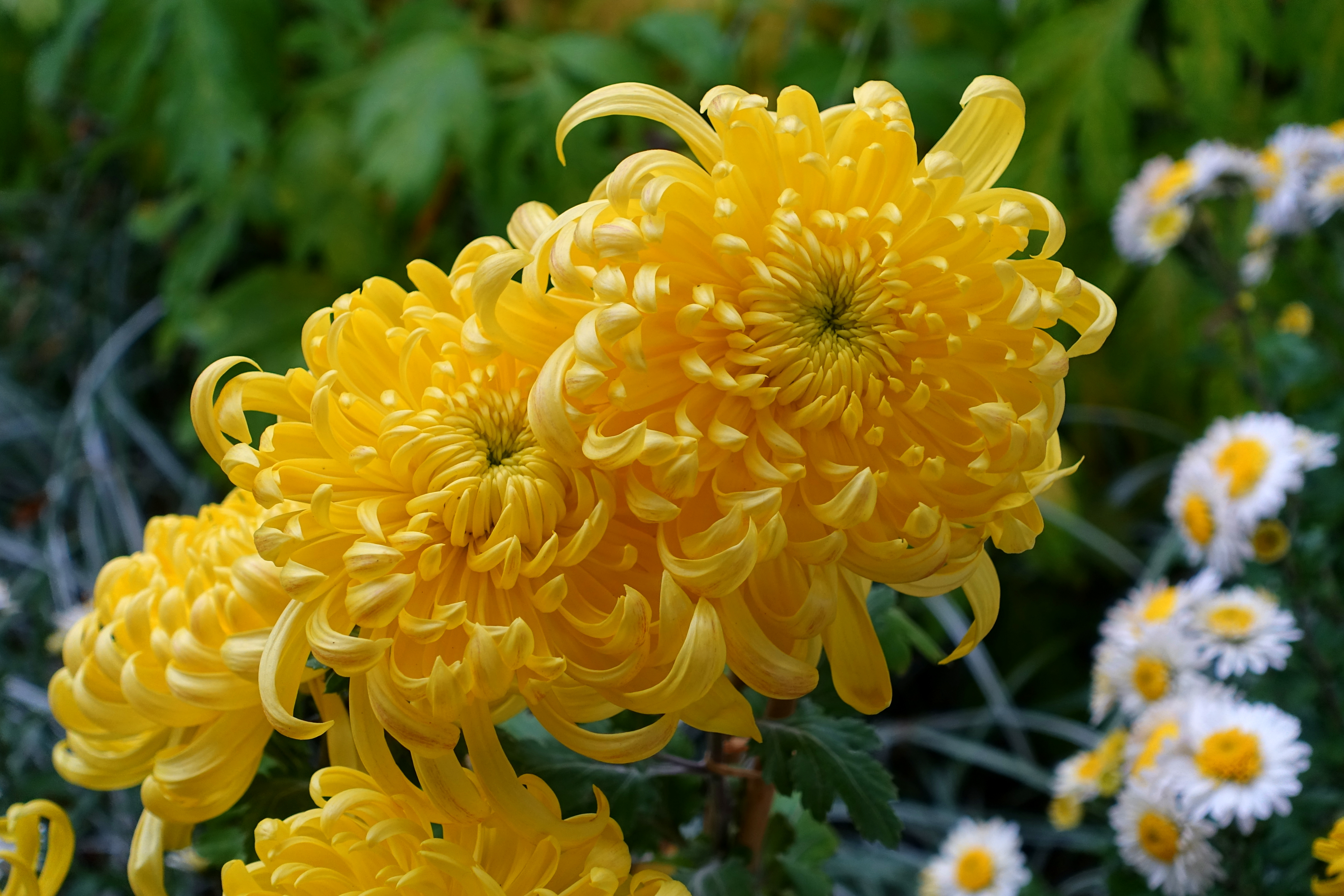
A picture of chrysanthemums in the garden

About 90% of the plants featured in the garden are indigenous to China. However, no plants were brought from China due to import bans. Instead, many plants were found in gardens and nurseries in Oregon, having grown from plants brought over before the import ban. Some plants in the garden are as old as 100 years. In total there are more than 400 species of trees, orchids, water plants, perennials, bamboos, and unusual shrubs located throughout the garden. Some of the plants include:

- Chinese parasol tree
- Daylily
- Star jasmine
- Variegated mock orange
- Hybrid gardenias
- Wintersweets
- Autumn flowering-osmanthus
- Chinese 12-month rose
- Southern magnolia
- Yulan magnolia
- Loquat
- Holly-leaf osmanthus
- Dove tree

=== Water ===
The dominant feature is the artificial Lake Zither at the center of the garden. Water covers 8,000 square feet (20%) of the garden's total area, creating a visual impact of the water seeming to be much more widespread throughout the space. The inclusion of Lake Zither is a technique used in Chinese gardens to avoid straight lines. "The simplest law of geometry is that the straight line between two points is the shortest. Thus, twisting the lines of corridors, paths, waterways, and even the boundaries of buildings makes a space feel larger." Reflection off a body of water such as Lake Zither also helps enhance and broaden the area visually.

=== Garden structure ===
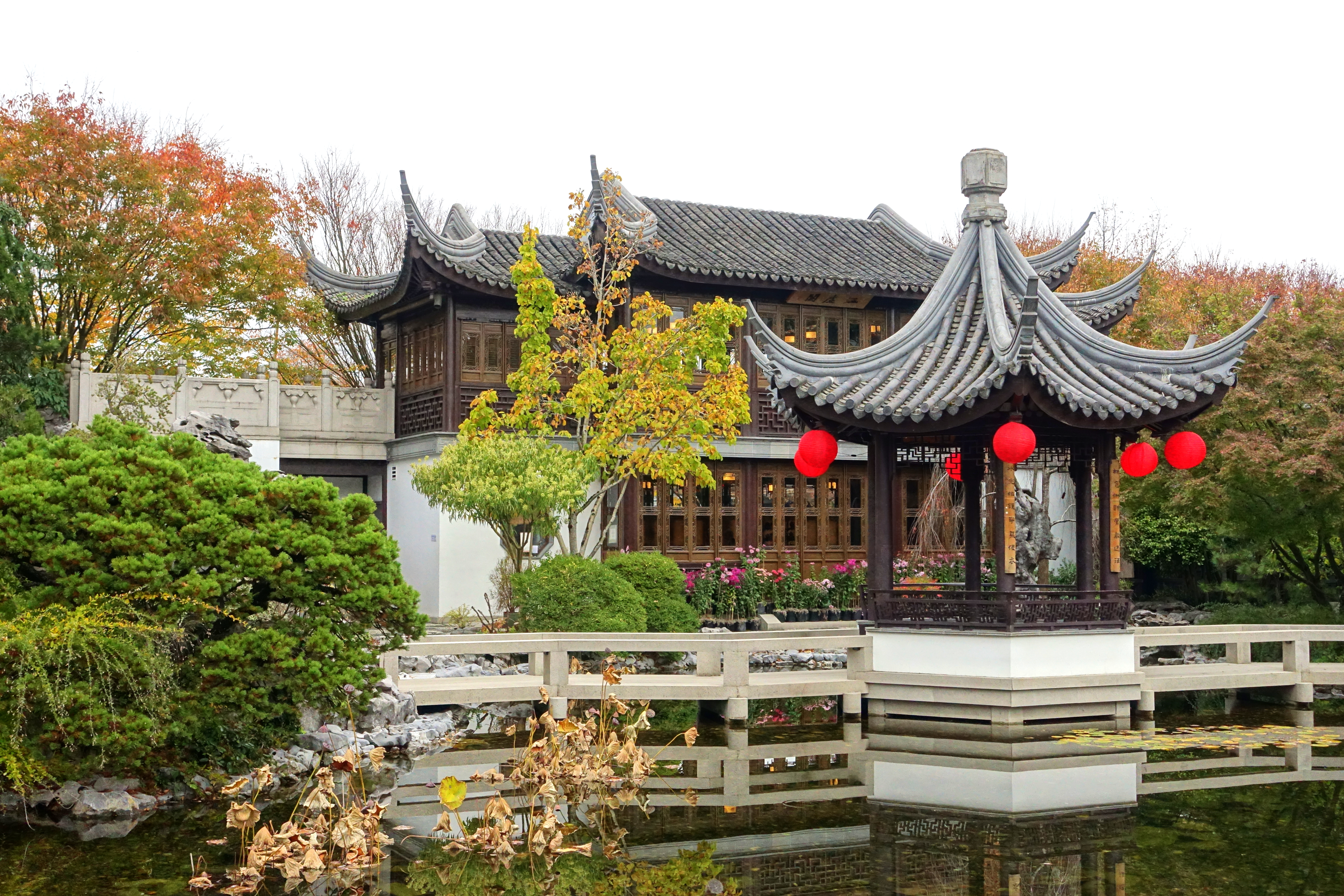
Moon Locking Pavilion and Tower of Cosmic Reflections

Lan Su features a number of structures common to Chinese gardens, including covered walkways (láng), bridges (qiáo), and thresholds (ménkǎn). Examples of such structures in Lan Su Chinese Garden are:

- Celestial Hall of Permeating Fragrance (a xuān or scholar's studio for practicing the Four Arts of the Chinese Scholar);
- Flowers Bathing in Spring Rain (a shǔixìe or water-side pavilion)
- Painted Boat in Misty Rain (a fáng or boat-shaped pavilion)
- Moon Locking Pavilion (a tíng, or stopping place)
- Tower of Cosmic Reflection (a lóu or two-storied building)
- Crabapple Blossom Gate (a doorway with a ménkǎn or door threshold)

== See also ==
- History of Chinese Americans in Portland, Oregon
- List of botanical gardens in the United States
- List of Chinese gardens
- Mei Sum Bakery
