= Portland Puppet Museum =

Puppet museum in Portland, Oregon, U.S.

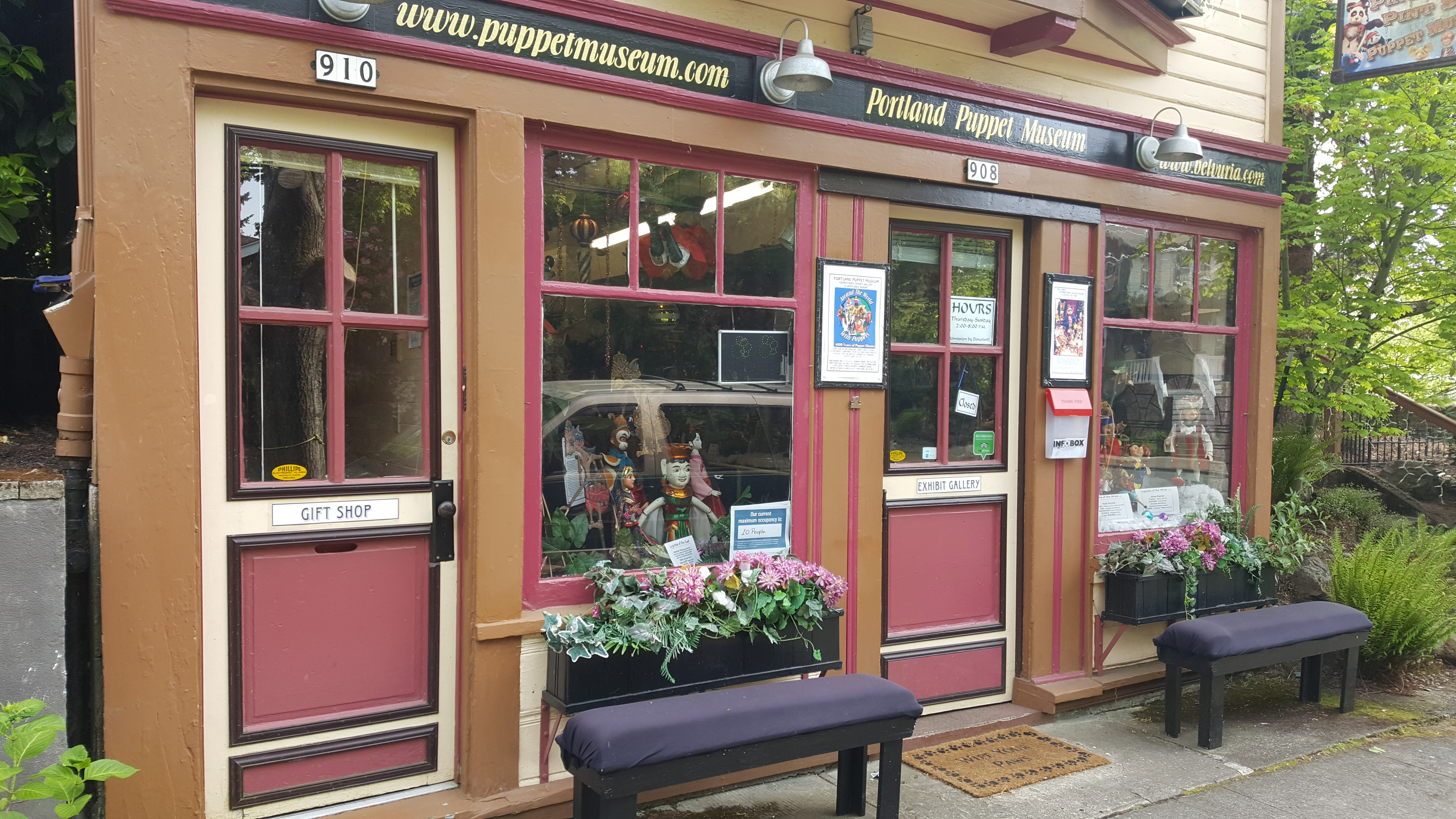
- Entrance to the museum, 2021
- Established: 2012
- Location: 906 Southeast Umatilla Street, Portland, Oregon, United States
- Coordinates: 45.4628°N 122.6567°W
- Founder: Steven Overton
- Website: puppetmuseum.com

The Portland Puppet Museum is a puppet museum founded and curated by Steven Overton, located in Portland, Oregon's Sellwood-Moreland neighborhood. The museum was established in 2012, and has been described as one of the city's "most unconventional" museums.

== See also ==
- Culture of Portland, Oregon
- List of museums in Portland, Oregon
