= Portland Police Museum =

Law enforcement museum in Portland, Oregon, U.S.

Coordinates: 45.51506°N 122.67654°W

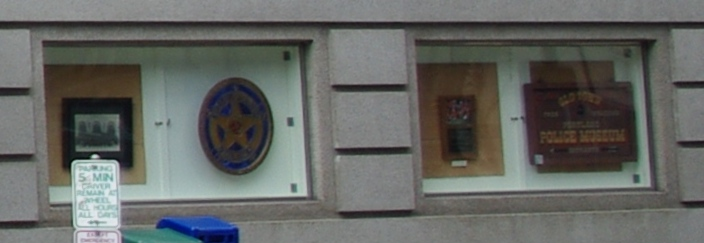
- Exterior museum exhibits
- Location: Portland, Oregon, U.S.

The Portland Police Museum is a museum located inside the Department of Justice building in downtown Portland, Oregon, United States. It showcases artifacts related to the city's law enforcement history. Admission is free.

== See also ==
- Culture of Portland, Oregon
