= Herzog Heine Geduld =

Defunct U.S. financial services company

Herzog Heine Geduld, Inc.
- Type: Private company
- Industry: Financial services
- Founded: 1925
- Founder: Robert I. Herzog
- Defunct: 2000
- Fate: Acquired by Merrill Lynch
- Successor: Merrill Lynch
- Headquarters: Jersey City, New Jersey, United States
- Area served: United States
- Products: Stockbroker, bond trading, investment banking

Herzog Heine Geduld was an American market making company that specialized in NASDAQ and OTC securities. It was one of the largest and most prominent market makers in the United States.

Herzog Heine Geduld was acquired by Merrill Lynch in 2000 for $968 million.

== History ==
=== Founding and early history ===
The firm of Parmer, Herzog & Chadwick was established by Robert I. Herzog in 1926 as a bond trading and brokerage company. The company suffered severe losses in the stock market crash of 1929 but stayed in business by trading in foreign bonds. Over the years, the firm evolved into Herzog Heine Geduld Inc., becoming a member of the New York Stock Exchange.

=== Acquisition by Merrill Lynch ===
By 2000, the Nasdaq market, fueled by the Tech Bubble was booming and Herzog was the third largest market maker, with an eight percent market share.

After buying Herzog, Merrill increased its Nasdaq market-making from 650 stocks to 10,000, many of them not popular enough to be listed on the main Nasdaq market. It began trading thousands of smaller companies on Nasdaq's OTC Bulletin Board or via the Pink Sheets.

== Notable people ==
- John E. Herzog, founder of the Museum of American Finance
