= American Advertising Museum =

Museum in Portland, Oregon

- Established: 1986
- Dissolved: 2004
- Location: Portland, Oregon, United States
- Type: Private: Advertising
- Visitors: 4,000-6,000

The American Advertising Museum was a museum in downtown Portland, Oregon, United States. Founded in 1986, the museum displayed advertising from the 18th century to the present day. The museum featured both permanent and traveling exhibits on advertising campaigns, industry icons, and advertising in general. There was also a library and gift shop before it closed by the end of 2004.

== History ==
Mick Scott with Leonard W. Lanfranco's assistance, opened the museum in 1986. Homer P. Groening, Matt Groening's father, was also one of the founding directors of the museum. It opened on June 26 of that year in the Erickson Saloon building and was initiated by the Portland Advertising Federation. At the time it was the only museum in the world devoted solely to advertising. For a time from 1995 to 1996 the museum was located on the city's Eastside.

In 1996, the museum moved to a location in Portland's Old Town Chinatown neighborhood. The PBS show Antiques Roadshow featured the museum in a 1999 episode. In 2000, the William F. Eisner Museum of Advertising & Design museum opened in Milwaukee, Wisconsin, and the AAM was no longer the only museum to focus exclusively on advertising. The AAM relocated to Portland's Chinatown district in 2001. In 2003, the HMH ad agency won an ADDY award for their design for the museum's stationery.

By February 2004 the Eisner Museum had acquired the American Advertising Museum collections as an exchange for paying its debts, and the AAM was closed. However, the Eisner Museum in turn closed in 2010, when the building it was located in was sold. As of 2014, the disposition of the museum's collection and archives is unknown.

== Features ==
The American Advertising Museum had a library, a rare books collection, manuscripts from national advertising campaigns, and a gallery of prints of historic ads. Their exhibits included displays on icons from the advertising world, "Aunt Jemima Meets Mr. Peanut", and displays from a permanent collection featuring advertising from as early as the 18th century. Additionally, it had one of the six original Jantzen Diving Girls once featured at places such as Jantzen Beach Amusement Park and Portland's PGE Park. Last located on NW Fifth Avenue, the museum contained a gift shop featuring advertising themed merchandise.

Exhibits included displays on Coca-Cola, political campaigning, Cream of Wheat ads, a homage to bad advertisements, and women in advertisements among others.

== See also ==
- Culture of Portland, Oregon
