= Japanese American Museum of Oregon =

Museum in Portland, Oregon, U.S.

- Location: 411 Northwest Flanders Street, Portland, Oregon, United States
- Coordinates: 45°31′34″N 122°40′29″W
- Website: jamo.org

The Japanese American Museum of Oregon is a museum in Portland, Oregon, United States. It operates in the northwest Portland part of the Old Town Chinatown neighborhood.

== See also ==
- Culture of Portland, Oregon
- History of Japanese Americans in Portland, Oregon
- List of museums in Portland, Oregon
