= Stark's Vacuum Museum =

Vacuum cleaner museum in Portland, Oregon, U.S.

- Exterior of the store that houses the museum, 2016
- Location: 107 Northeast Grand Avenue; Portland, Oregon, United States
- Coordinates: 45.52392°N 122.66099°W
- Website: starks.com/vacuum-museum

Stark's Vacuum Museum, also known as Stark's Vacuum Cleaner Museum, is a vacuum cleaner museum in Portland, Oregon. It showcases more than 100 vacuums from the late-1800s to the 1960s within a 10 feet (3.0 m) x 40-foot (12 m) section of the Stark's Vacuums store. Admission is free. Pieces include a 1930s cardboard model, a Duntley Pneumatic that attaches to the ceiling, an Electrolux on runners, and hand-pumped vacs.

== Reception ==
The museum has been called "quirky" and included in lists highlighting the more peculiar aspects of Portland ("Keep Portland Weird"). In 2014, CNN reported that the museum averaged around a dozen visitors per month. USA Today called the guides "highly knowledgeable".

== See also ==
- Culture of Portland, Oregon
- List of museums in Portland, Oregon
