= Velveteria =

Defunct museum

Velveteria: The Museum of Velvet Paintings
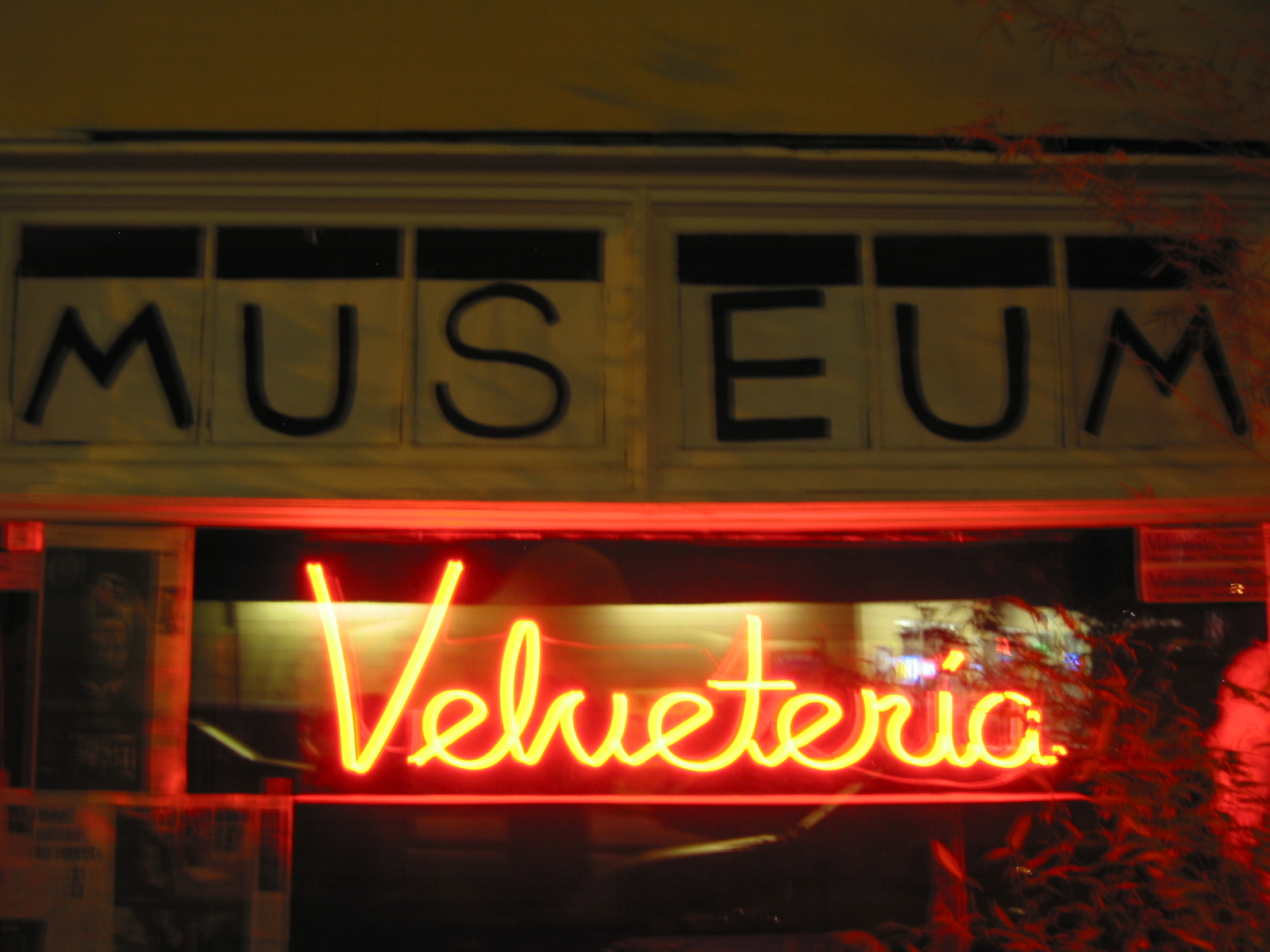
- Neon sign for Velveteria in 2006
- Established: December 2005 (Portland, Oregon); December 2013 (Los Angeles, California)
- Location: Portland, Oregon: 518 NE 28th Avenue (2005–2008); 2448 E. Burnside Street (2008–2010); Los Angeles, California: 711 New High Street (2013–present)
- Website: Official website

Velveteria: The Museum of Velvet Art was a museum dedicated to paintings on velvet, established in 2005 in Portland Oregon and relocated in 2013 to Los Angeles, California. In Los Angeles it was formally known as Velveteria Epicenter of Art Fighting Cultural Deprivation. The establishment housed hundreds of paintings from founders Caren Anderson and Carl Baldwin's personal collection of over 2,000 pieces, and was reportedly the only one of its kind. The Velveteria closed in Portland in January 2010 due to financial difficulties and the couple's relocation to Southern California. It was reopened in Chinatown, Los Angeles in 2013. It was permanently closed c. 2020-2021 during the COVID-19 pandemic.

== History ==
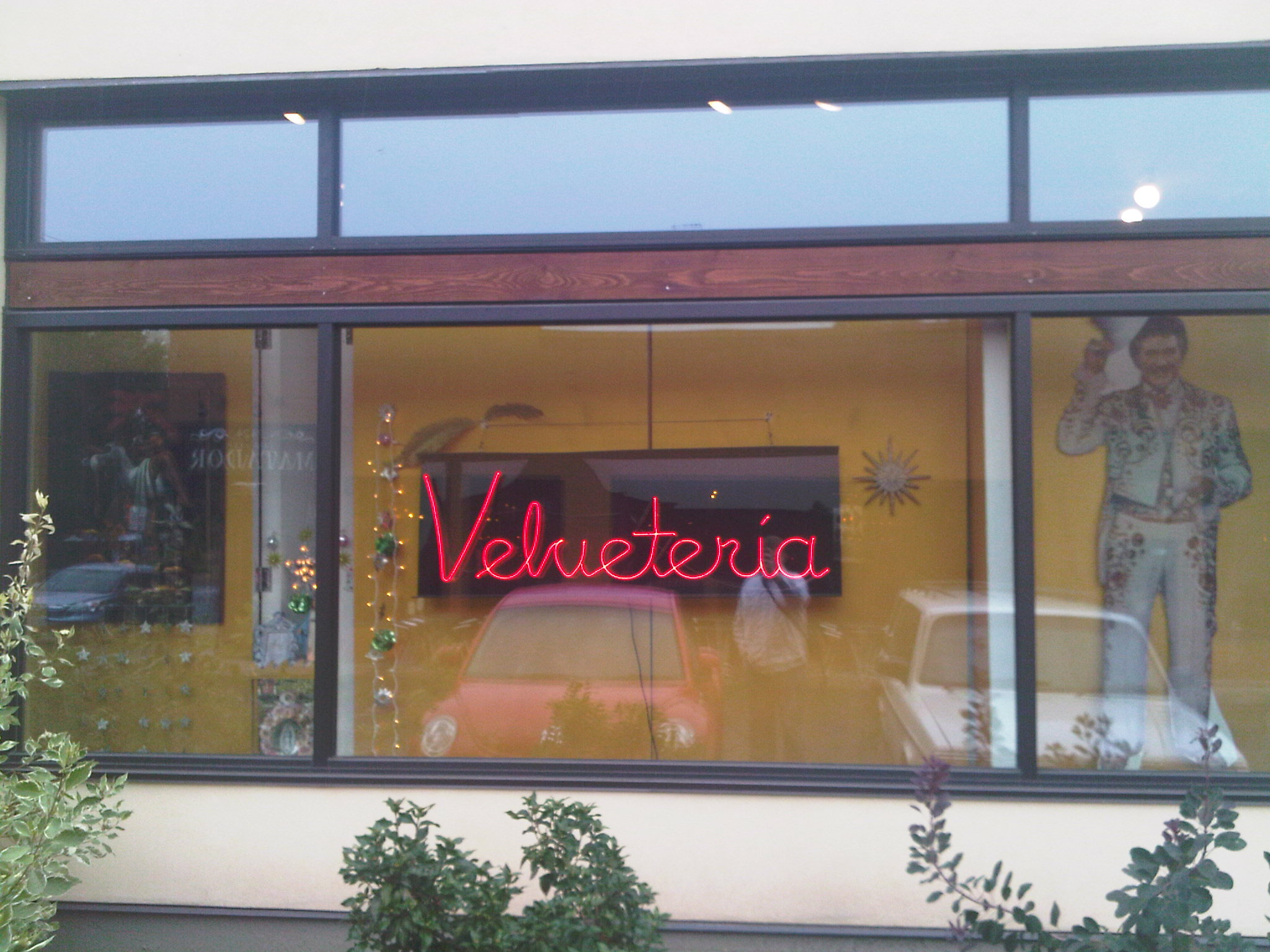
Outside view of Velveteria in Portland, Oregon in 2009

The museum was established by Caren Anderson and Carl Baldwin, California natives residing in Portland, Oregon. It opened in 2005 at 518 NE 28th Avenue with a $3 admission price.

During the month of May 2008, a collection of works were showcased at Powell's Books. The museum relocated to a larger space, located at 2448 East Burnside Street, in 2008, and increased the admission price to $5. However, rental costs were more than three times higher and in January 2010, Velveteria closed when Anderson and Baldwin relocated to Southern California. According to Anderson and Baldwin, they "never made any real money" from Velveteria, a name they trademarked. The couple wrote a book about the museum, titled Black Velvet Masterpieces: Highlights from the Collection of the Velveteria Museum.

In December, 2013, Velveteria re-opened as the Velveteria Epicenter of Art Fighting Cultural Deprivation in Los Angeles. The cost of admission was $10 as of 2017. In 2019, the Velveteria was facing financial difficulties again.

== Description ==
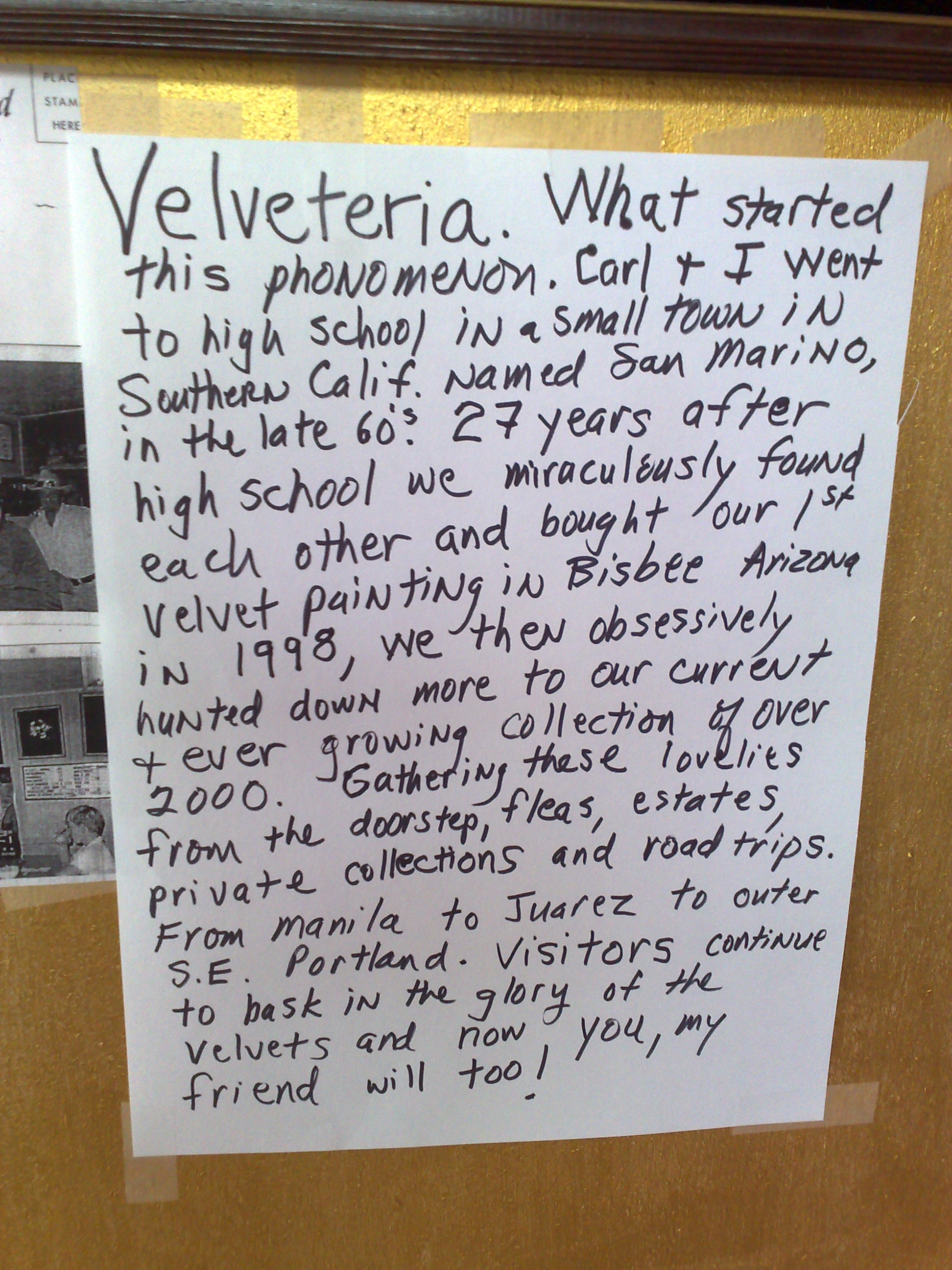
Example of handwritten commentary provided by owners Caren Anderson and Carl Baldwin

Velveteria was originally located in an "incongruously bland-looking storefront" on East Burnside Street. Leading to the museum were "hot-pink crushed" velvet curtains. The entrance had a sign describing the museum as "a life-changing experience! Without crawling over broken glass or walking on hot coals!" The museum housed 400 velvet paintings from the couple's personal collection of more than 2,000 pieces. No items were for sale. The first location included a "Nudes Room". Some works were displayed within a black light room. Handwritten comments from the couple were displayed throughout the museum.

Works depict blessed virgins, landscapes, sad clowns and "voluptuous" nude women. Unicorn Combover portrayed a unicorn whose mane morphed into a woman's hairdo. The museum included a shrine to Michael Jackson; other portrait pieces depicted Anderson Cooper, Jesus, Abraham Lincoln and Elvis Presley.

== Reception ==
Velveteria was featured on The Tonight Show with Jay Leno in September 2006, Anthony Bourdain: No Reservations in January 2007, and CBS News Sunday Morning and MSN's Appetite for Life with Andrew Zimmern in 2009. In 2010, Kristi Turnquist of The Oregonian wrote that Anderson and Baldwin personified the "Keep Portland Weird" slogan and that the museum was "evidence of the city's quirky creativity". Anderson admitted to being tired of this association.

== Los Angeles rebirth and closure ==
Velveteria was located in a storefront on New High Street in the Chinatown neighborhood of downtown Los Angeles, and was the idea of Caren Anderson and partner Carl Baldwin, a Los Angeles native. It is now listed as permanently closed.

== See also ==
- Culture of Portland, Oregon
- Glossary of textile manufacturing
- List of museums in Oregon
