= Forrest Frank discography =

- Studio albums: 10
- EPs: 6
- Singles: 56
- Promotional singles: 5
- Music videos: 17
- Featured singles: 5

The discography of the Christian pop musician Forrest Frank consists of ten studio albums (six of which independent, two of which remix albums, and two of which Christmas albums), six extended plays, 58 singles (five of which as featured artist), five promotional singles, and 17 music videos.

In 2018, Frank launched his solo career under the mononymous stage name Forrest. On July 1 of that year, he released Warm, under the label Houseboat Records. After signing to River House Records, he released five albums under the label, including Effortless on July 24, 2020, Nostalgia Pack on May 26, 2023, California Cowboy on June 16, 2023, New Hymns on October 30, 2023, and A Merry Lofi Christmas on November 10, 2023. Following the release of Frank's eighth studio album, Child of God II in 2025, New Hymns entered the Billboard Top Christian Albums chart, where it peaked at number 43.

In 2024, Frank was signed to 10K Projects and Warner Music Group, and made his label debut, the God Is Good EP. The extended play hit number 5 on the Billboard Top Christian Albums, becoming Frank's first entry onto the chart. God Is Good was followed by the All the Time and Never Get Used to This EPs. The extended plays preceded Frank's major label debut, Child of God, which was released on July 26, 2024. Child of God became a commercial success upon release, selling 22,000 copies in the United States within its first week. The album achieved a peak of number 28 on the Billboard 200, number 3 on the OCC Official Christian & Gospel Albums Chart, and number 1 the Top Christian Albums chart. It garnered a Grammy Award nomination for Best Contemporary Music Album. At the year-end charts of 2024, the album was positioned at number 12 on the Top Christian Albums, and the following year, it appeared at the top position as well as at number 120 on the Billboard 200.

Subsequent to the release of Child of God, Frank began releasing material for his second major label project, with the releases of the Amen, Woke Up This Morning, and Home extended plays. Amen and Woke Up This Morning each charted at number 3 on the Top Christian Albums chart. On May 9, 2025, the full-length album, Child of God II, was released. The album went on to sell 33,000 copies within its first week, leading it to hit number 12 on the Billboard 200 chart, number 1 on the Top Christian Albums chart, number 3 on the UK Christian & Gospel Albums Chart, and number 83 on the OCC UK Album Downloads Chart. With support from the album's release, its lead single, "Your Way's Better", concurrently rose to top the Billboard Hot Christian Songs chart that same week, becoming Frank's first leader on the chart. Child of God II completed 2025 at number 168 on the Billboard 200 and number 2 on the Top Christian Albums year-end charts. The album received a Grammy Award nomination for Best Contemporary Christian Music Album. Following Child of God II's release, Frank released several four singles to commercial acclaim, including the Hot 100-charted "Lemonade". The tracks would later appear on the deluxe edition of the prior album. In December 2025, Frank released a collaborative Christmas album, This Is What Christmas Feels Like, with frequent collaborator Jvke, and in 2026 released a sole single, "2026", with Andy Mineo. His solo career was halted to pursue work with the newly formed superduo, Party Wave.

== Albums ==
=== Studio albums ===
| Title | Details | Peak chart positions | | | | Certifications |
| Title | Details | US | US Christ. | UK C&G | UK Down. | Certifications |
|---|---|---|---|---|---|---|
| Child of God | Released: July 26, 2024; Label: River House Records, 10K Projects/Warner Music Group; Formats: CD, LP, cassette, digital download, streaming | 28 | 1 | 3 | — | RIAA: Gold |
| Child of God II | Released: May 9, 2025; Label: River House, 10K/Warner; Formats: CD, LP, digital download, streaming | 12 | 1 | 3 | 83 | |
| The Jesus Generation | Released: December 4, 2026; Label: River House; Formats: CD, LP, cassette, digital download, streaming | To be released | | | | |
"—" denotes a recording that did not chart or was not released in that territory.

=== Independent albums ===
| Title | Details | Peak chart positions |
| Title | Details | US Christ. |
|---|---|---|
| Warm (with Biskwiq) | Released: July 1, 2018; Label: Houseboat; Formats: Digital download, streaming | — |
| Effortless | Released: July 24, 2020; Label: River House Records; Formats: Digital download, streaming | — |
| Nostalgia Pack | Released: May 26, 2023; Label: River House; Formats: Digital download, streaming | — |
| California Cowboy | Released: June 16, 2023; Label: River House; Formats: Digital download, streaming | — |
| New Hymns | Released: October 30, 2023; Label: River House; Formats: Digital download, streaming | 43 |
"—" denotes a recording that did not chart or was not released in that territory.

=== Remix albums ===
| Title | Details |
|---|---|
| Jesus Lofi Volume One (with The Lofi Christian) | Released: October 10, 2025; Label: River House, 10K/Warner; Formats: Digital download, streaming |
| Jesus Lofi Volume Two (with The Lofi Christian) | Released: November 7, 2025; Label: Jesus Loves You; Formats: Digital download, streaming |
| Jesus Is Alive (Vol. 1) | Released: May 15, 2026; Label: River House; Formats: Digital download, streaming |
| Jesus Is Alive (Vol. 2) | Releasing: TBA; Label: TBA; Formats: TBA |

=== Christmas albums ===
| Title | Details |
|---|---|
| A Merry Lofi Christmas | Released: November 10, 2023; Label: River House; Formats: CD, cassette, digital download, streaming |

=== Collaborative albums ===
| Title | Details | Peak chart positions | |
| Title | Details | US Christ. | US Holiday |
|---|---|---|---|
| This Is What Christmas Feels Like (with Jvke) | Released: December 5, 2025; Label: JVKE/AWAL; Formats: Digital download, streaming | 7 | 44 |
| Dawn Patrol (with Noah Hayden as Party Wave) | Released: April 8, 2026; Label: River House; Formats: CD, LP, digital download, streaming | 4 | — |
"—" denotes a recording that did not chart or was not released in that territory.

== Compilations ==
| Title | Details |
|---|---|
| Forrest Frank Favorites for Kids | Released: June 5, 2026; Label: Semsen Music; Formats: Digital download, streaming |

== Extended plays ==
| Title | Details | Peak chart positions |
| Title | Details | US Christ. |
|---|---|---|
| God Is Good | Released: April 12, 2024; Label: River House Records, 10K/Warner; Formats: Digital download, streaming | 5 |
| All the Time | Released: April 26, 2024; Label: River House, 10K, Warner; Formats: DD, streaming | — |
| Never Get Used to This | Released: July 9, 2024; Label: River House, 10K, Warner; Formats: DD, streaming | — |
| Amen | Released: April 25, 2025; Label: River House, 10K, Warner; Formats: DD, streaming | 3 |
| Woke Up This Morning | Released: May 2, 2025; Label: River House, 10K, Warner; Formats: DD, streaming | 3 |
| Home | Released: May 5, 2025; Label: River House, 10K, Warner; Formats: DD, streaming | — |
"—" denotes a recording that did not chart or was not released in that territory.

== Singles ==
=== As lead artist ===
| Title | Year | Peak chart positions | | | | | | Certifications | Album |
| Title | Year | US | US Christ. | US Christ. Air. | US Christ. Stream. | NZ Hot | UK Indie | Certifications | Album |
|---|---|---|---|---|---|---|---|---|---|
| "Saturday Blues" | 2018 | — | — | — | — | — | — | | Nostalgia Pack |
| "Your Soul" | 2018 | — | — | — | — | — | — | | Warm Nostalgia Pack |
| "Sunday" (with Biskwiq) | 2018 | — | — | — | — | — | — | | Warm Nostalgia Pack |
| "Dance in the Living Room" (with Nvthvn featuring k2222 and Park Bird) | 2018 | — | — | — | — | — | — | | Non-album single |
| "Lately" (with Biskwiq and Ryce) | 2018 | — | — | — | — | — | — | | Nostalgia Pack |
| "Be Honest" (featuring Wizard Island) | 2019 | — | — | — | — | — | — | | Nostalgia Pack |
| "Tonight" (with Peter Kuli) | 2019 | — | — | — | — | — | — | | Non-album single |
| "My Room" | 2019 | — | — | — | — | — | — | | Nostalgia Pack |
| "So Good" (featuring khai dreams) | 2019 | — | — | — | — | — | — | | Nostalgia Pack |
| "Never Had" | 2020 | — | — | — | — | — | — | | Effortless |
| "Backwards" | 2020 | — | — | — | — | — | — | | Effortless |
| "Slow Down" | 2022 | — | — | — | — | — | — | | Non-album singles |
| "1234" | 2022 | — | — | — | — | — | — | | Non-album singles |
| "Back In" | 2022 | — | — | — | — | — | — | | Non-album singles |
| "Always Been You" | 2022 | — | — | — | — | — | — | | Non-album singles |
| "Till Christmas Day" | 2022 | — | — | — | — | — | — | | Non-album singles |
| "What's the Use?" | 2022 | — | — | — | — | — | — | | Non-album singles |
| "No Longer Bound" (with Hulvey or with Maverick City Music) | 2023 | — | 19 | — | — | — | — | | California Cowboy Child of God |
| "Ride" | 2023 | — | — | — | — | — | — | | Non-album single |
| "Lift My Hands" | 2023 | — | — | — | — | — | — | | Child of God |
| "Diggin U" | 2023 | — | — | — | — | — | — | | California Cowboy |
| "Just Friends" | 2023 | — | — | — | — | — | — | | California Cowboy |
| "Is It Really Over?" | 2023 | — | — | — | — | — | — | | California Cowboy |
| "Nothing but the Blood" (with Lecrae) | 2023 | — | 47 | — | — | — | — | | New Hymns |
| "Thank You" | 2023 | — | — | — | — | — | — | | Non-album single |
| "Amazing Grace" | 2023 | — | — | — | — | — | — | | New Hymns |
| "Go Tell It" | 2023 | — | — | — | — | — | — | | New Hymns |
| "Jesus Paid It All" | 2023 | — | — | — | — | — | — | | New Hymns |
| "Fly Away" (with Hulvey) | 2023 | — | 43 | — | — | — | — | | New Hymns |
| "Hallelujah" | 2024 | — | 39 | — | — | — | — | | Child of God |
| "Good Day" | 2024 | — (Note: "Good Day" did not enter the Billboard Hot 100, but peaked at No. 4 on the Bubbling Under Hot 100 chart.) | 2 | 5 | 2 | — | — | RMNZ: Gold | Child of God |
| "Up!" (with Connor Price) | 2024 | — | 8 | — | 5 | — | — | | Child of God |
| "Always" | 2024 | — | 20 | — | — | — | — | | Child of God |
| "Low Key" | 2024 | — | 36 | — | — | — | — | | God Is Good EP All the Time EP |
| "God Is Good" (with Caleb Gordon) | 2024 | — | 18 | — | 23 | — | — | | Child of God |
| "All the Time" (with nobigdyl.) | 2024 | — | 50 | — | — | — | — | | All the Time EP |
| "Beautiful as Ever" (with Powfu and Nextseasons) | 2024 | — | 38 | — | — | — | — | | Non-album single |
| "Never Get Used to This" (with Jvke) | 2024 | — | 6 | 18 | 3 | 39 | — | | Child of God |
| "Your Way's Better" | 2024 | 61 | 1 | 3 | 1 | — | 18 | RIAA: Gold; RMNZ: Gold | Child of God II |
| "The Present" | 2024 | — | 9 | 10 | — | — | — | | Non-album single |
| "Drop!" | 2025 | — | 18 | — | — | — | — | | Child of God II |
| "Sunrise" | 2025 | — | 20 | — | — | — (Note: "Sunrise" did not enter the Official Aotearoa Music Charts, but peaked at No. 40 on the Radioscope Most Added chart.) | — | | Non-album single |
| "Nothing Else" (with Thomas Rhett) | 2025 | — (Note: "Nothing Else" did not enter the Billboard Hot 100, but peaked at No. 14 on the Billboard Digital Song Sales.) | 4 | 29 | 3 | 31 | — | | Child of God II |
| "No L's" | 2025 | — | 12 | — | 21 | — | — | | Child of God II |
| "Celebration" | 2025 | — | 11 | — | 15 | — (Note: "Celebration" did not enter the Official Aotearoa Music Charts, but peaked at No. 23 on the Radioscope Most Added chart.) | — | | Child of God II |
| "God's Got My Back" | 2025 | — (Note: "God's Got My Back" did not enter the Billboard Hot 100, but peaked at No. 16 on the Billboard Digital Song Sales.) | 5 | — | 6 | 31 | — | | Child of God II (Back to Back) Deluxe |
| "Lemonade" (with The Figs) | 2025 | 77 | 2 | 36 | 2 | 17 | — | | Child of God II (Back to Back) Deluxe |
| "Selah" | 2025 | — | 8 | — | 15 | — | — | | Child of God II (Back to Back) Deluxe |
| "The Rock" (with Crowder) | 2025 | — (Note: "The Rock" did not enter the Billboard Hot 100, but peaked at No. 4 on the Billboard Digital Song Sales.) | 6 | — | 9 | — | — | | Child of God II (Back to Back) Deluxe |
| "Jesus Is Coming Back Soon" (with Josiah Queen) | 2025 | — (Note: "Jesus Is Coming Back Soon" did not enter the Billboard Hot 100, but peaked at No. 3 on the Billboard Digital Song Sales.) | 6 | — | 12 | 22 | — | | Damascus Road |
| "Keep It Simple" | 2025 | — | 25 | — | — | — | — | | Non-album singles |
| "Thankful" | 2025 | — (Note: "Thankful" did not enter the Billboard Hot 100, but peaked at No. 15 on the Billboard Digital Song Sales.) | 6 | 27 | 1 | — | — | | Non-album singles |
| "2026" (with Andy Mineo) | 2026 | — | — | — | — | — | — | | Non-album singles |
| "SOS" (with Noah Hayden as Party Wave) | 2026 | — | 23 | — | — | — | — | | Dawn Patrol |
| "Waste Some Time" (with Noah Hayden as Party Wave) | 2026 | — | 25 | — | — | — | — | | Dawn Patrol |
| "Something in the Water" (with Noah Hayden as Party Wave) | 2026 | — | 29 | — | — | — | — | | Dawn Patrol |
| "Okay!" | 2026 | — (Note: "Okay!" did not enter the Billboard Hot 100, but peaked at No. 22 on the Billboard Bubbling Under Hot 100.) | 4 | 7 | 11 | — | — | | The Jesus Generation |
| "Jesus Is Alive!" | 2026 | — (Note: "Jesus Is Alive!" did not enter the Billboard Hot 100, but peaked at No. 8 on the Billboard Bubbling Under Hot 100 Singles.) | 1 (Note: Twenty different remixes of "Jesus Is Alive!" were released; the Billboard chart entry for "Jesus Is Alive!" combines sales statistics from all remixes of the song.) | — | 1 (Note: Twenty different remixes of "Jesus Is Alive!" were released; the Billboard chart entry for "Jesus Is Alive!" combines sales statistics from all remixes of the song.) | — | — | | The Jesus Generation |
| "The Jesus Generation" | 2026 | — | 25 | — | — | — | — | | Non-album singles |
| "Truth Will Set You Free" | 2026 | — | 24 | — | — | — | — | | Non-album singles |
| "Somebody Prayed" (with Tate Butts) | 2026 | — (Note: "Somebody Prayed" did not enter the Billboard Hot 100, but peaked at No. 23 on the Billboard Digital Song Sales.) | 17 | — | — | — | — | | Non-album singles |
| "2 Step the Enemy" (with Lost & Found and Zvc) | 2026 | — (Note: "2 Step the Enemy" did not enter the Billboard Hot 100, but peaked at No. 19 on the Billboard Digital Song Sales.) | 16 | — | — | — | — | | Non-album singles |
"—" denotes a recording that did not chart or was not released in that territory.

=== As featured artist ===
| Title | Year | Peak chart positions | | Certifications | Album |
| Title | Year | US Christ. | US Christ. Air. | Certifications | Album |
|---|---|---|---|---|---|
| "Across the Room" (Public Library Commute featuring Forrest Frank) | 2021 | — | — | | Non-album single |
| "Altar" (Hulvey featuring Forrest Frank) | 2023 | 27 | — | RIAA: Gold | Cry |
| "Praises" (Elevation Rhythm featuring Forrest Frank) | 2023 | 26 | — | RIAA: Gold | Non-album single |
| "Heaven on My Mind" (TobyMac featuring Forrest Frank) | 2025 | 12 | 1 | | Heaven on My Mind |
| "Move It" (1K Phew featuring Forrest Frank and 1KPson) | 2025 | 41 | — | | What's Understood 3 |
"—" denotes a recording that did not chart or was not released in that territory.

== Promotional singles ==
| Title | Year | Peak chart positions | Album |
| Title | Year | US Christ. | Album |
|---|---|---|---|
| "Amen" | 2025 | 6 | Child of God II |
| "Woke Up This Morning" (with Nathan Davis Jr) | 2025 | 21 | Child of God II |
| "Home" | 2025 | 15 | Child of God II |
| "Misunderstood" (with Cory Asbury) | 2025 | 14 | Child of God II (Back to Back) Deluxe |
| "Lemonade" (folk remix) (with The Figs) | 2025 | — | Non-album single |
| "Christmas Morning" (with Jvke) | 2025 | 10 | This Is What Christmas Feels Like |
| "Her" (with Jvke) | 2025 | 30 | This Is What Christmas Feels Like |
| "This Is What a New Year Feels Like" (with Jvke) | 2025 | 25 | This Is What Christmas Feels Like |
| "Yahweh" (with Noah Hayden as Party Wave) | 2026 | 20 | Dawn Patrol |
| "What a Life" | 2026 | 10 | The Jesus Generation |
| "Go! Go! Go!" (with KB and Lecrae) | 2026 | 29 | The Jesus Generation |
| "My Little Miracle" (with Zvc) | 2026 | — | The Jesus Generation |
| "New Season" | 2026 | — | The Jesus Generation |
"—" denotes a recording that did not chart or was not released in that territory.

== Other charted songs ==
| Title | Year | Peak chart positions | | Album |
| Title | Year | US Christ. | US Rap Digital | Album |
|---|---|---|---|---|
| "Miracle Worker" (with Tori Kelly) | 2024 | 18 | — | Child of God |
| "Safe and Sound" (with Cain) | 2024 | 15 | — | Child of God |
| "Never Left My Side" | 2024 | 36 | — | Child of God |
| "More Than a Feeling" | 2024 | 42 | — | Child of God |
| "All I Need" (with Hulvey) | 2024 | 46 | — | Child of God |
| "Life is Good" | 2024 | 40 | — | Child of God |
| "Heaven on This Earth" (with Torey D'Shaun) | 2024 | 23 | 6 | Child of God (Deluxe) |
| "Ups & Downs" | 2024 | 35 | — | Child of God (Deluxe) |
| "Crazy" (with Nic D) | 2024 | 48 | — | Child of God (Deluxe) |
| "Encore" | 2025 | 44 | — | Child of God II |
| "B.I.G." | 2025 | 22 | — | Child of God II |
| "Father's House" | 2025 | 29 | — | Child of God II |
| "Paradise" | 2025 | 32 | — | Child of God II |
| "Dancing In the Presence" | 2025 | 37 | — | Child of God II |
| "Outside" | 2025 | 36 | — | Child of God II |
| "Live Your Life" | 2025 | 40 | — | Child of God II |
| "Happy" | 2025 | 25 | — | Child of God II |
| "Like Water" (with Limoblaze) | 2025 | 42 | — | Child of God II |
| "POV" | 2025 | 46 | — | Child of God II |
| "In the Room" | 2025 | 43 | — | Child of God II |
| "Through the Night" | 2025 | 49 | — | Child of God II (Back to Back); Deluxe |
| "This Is What Christmas Feels Like" (with Jvke) | 2025 | 14 | — | This Is What Christmas Feels Like |
| "Christmas Through Your Eyes" (with Jvke and Zvc) | 2025 | 17 | — | This Is What Christmas Feels Like |
| "Shine Your Light" (with Jvke) | 2025 | 21 | — | This Is What Christmas Feels Like |
| "The Cozy Part" (with Jvke) | 2025 | 29 | — | This Is What Christmas Feels Like |
| "CHRISTmas" (with Jvke) | 2025 | 16 | — | This Is What Christmas Feels Like |
"—" denotes a recording that did not chart or was not released in that territory.

== Music videos ==
| Title | Year | Album | Type | Source |
|---|---|---|---|---|
| "What's the use?" | 2022 | Non-album single | Lyrics | YouTube |
| "No Longer Bound" | 2023 | California Cowboy | Lyrics | YouTube |
| "No Longer Bound" | 2023 | Child of God | Performance | YouTube |
| "Lift My Hands" | 2023 | Child of God | Lyrics | YouTube |
| "Amazing Grace" | 2023 | New Hymns | Lyrics | YouTube |
| "Jesus Paid it All" | 2023 | New Hymns | Lyrics | YouTube |
| "UP!" | 2024 | Child of God | Performance | YouTube |
| "Good Day" | 2024 | Child of God | Narrative | YouTube |
| "God is Good" | 2024 | Child of God | Lyrics | YouTube |
| "Beautiful as Ever" | 2024 | Non-album single | Narrative | YouTube |
| "Miracle Worker" | 2024 | Child of God | Lyrics | YouTube |
| "Heaven On this Earth" | 2024 | Child of God (Deluxe) | Lyrics | YouTube |
| "The Present" | 2024 | Non-album singles | Lyrics | YouTube |
| "Sunrise" | 2025 | Non-album singles | Lyrics | YouTube |
| "Your Way's Better" | 2025 | Child of God II | Lyrics | YouTube |
| "God's Got My Back" | 2025 | Child of God II (Back To Back); Deluxe | Lyrics | YouTube |
| "Move It" | 2025 | Non-album singles | Performance | YouTube |
| "Jesus Is Coming Back Soon" | 2025 | Non-album singles | Performance | YouTube |
| "Christmas Morning" | 2025 | This Is What Christmas Feels Like | Lyrics | YouTube |
| "This Is What Chrismtas Feels Like" | 2025 | This Is What Christmas Feels Like | Lyrics | YouTube |
| "Her" | 2025 | This Is What Christmas Feels Like | Lyrics | YouTube |
| "This Is What a New Year Feels Like" | 2025 | This Is What Christmas Feels Like | Lyrics | YouTube |
| "CHRISTmas" | 2025 | This Is What Christmas Feels Like | Lyrics | YouTube |

== Compilation appearances ==
| Compilation | Details | Song |
|---|---|---|
| Sunny Beach Day | New Christian Pop | Released: August 8, 2025; Label: Universal; Formats: Digital download, streaming | "Heaven on My Mind" |
