= Forrest Frank production discography =

The following list is a discography of productions by Forrest Frank, an American rap/hip-hop and lo-fi musician from Fulshear, Texas. It features a selected list of songs produced, co-produced, remixed, and written by Forrest Frank, organized by year (oldest to newest).

== Production discography ==
Adapted from AllMusic.

Song / Album	Year	Artist	Role
Kids Hits	2006	Various artists	Composer; mixing; producer; vocals
"On My Own"	2016	Eli & Fur	Composer
Surf	2018	Surfaces	Composer; mixing; producer; vocals
Where the Light Is	2019	Surfaces	Composer; mixing; producer; vocals
Work at Home	2020	Various artists	Composer; mixing; producer; vocals
Trending Now	2020	Various artists	Composer; mixing; producer; vocals
Party Tyme Karaoke: Super Hits 36	2020	Various artists	Composer
Now Thats What I Call Music! 74	2020	Various artists	Composer
Now That's What I Call Music, Vol. 75	2020	Various artists	Composer
Now That's What I Call Music, Vol. 74	2020	Various artists	Composer; mixing; producer; vocals
Nostalgia	2020	Surfaces	Composer; mixing; producer; vocals
Kidz Bop 2021	2020	Kidz Bop Kidz	Composer
Horizons	2020	Surfaces	Composer; mixing; producer
Best of the Year 2020	2020	Various artists	Composer; mixing; producer; vocals
Best of 2020 Pop	2020	Various artists	Composer; mixing; producer; vocals
Alt Pop	2020	Various artists	Composer
Trending Now, Vol. 23	2021	Universal Music Group	Composer; producer
The Lockdown Sessions	2021	Elton John	Composer; producer
Pacifico	2021	Surfaces	Composer; engineer; producer
Nine in the Morning	2021	Various artists	Composer; producer
Massive Hits	2021	Various artists	Composer; mixing; producer; vocals
Hits Brasil 2021	2021	Various artists	Composer; mixing; producer; vocals
Chill in the Rain	2021	Various artists	Composer; mixing; producer; vocals
"C'est La Vie"	2021	Thomas Rhett; Surfaces	Composer; engineer; producer
"Awaken (Feel Alive)"	2021	Big Wild; Surfaces	Composer; engineer
Top Hits 2022	2022	Various artists	Composer; mixing; producer; vocals
The Sounds of Lockdown	2022	Home Free	Composer
Hidden Youth	2022	Surfaces	Composer; producer
"No Longer Bound (I'm Free)"	2023	Forrest Frank; Chandler Moore; Maverick City Music	Featured artist
Kids Ultimate Chillout	2023	Kidz Bop Kidz	Composer
Kids Thanksgiving	2023	Kidz Bop Kidz	Composer
Kids Pool Party	2023	Kidz Bop Kidz	Composer
Kids Feel Good Hits	2023	Kidz Bop Kidz	Composer
Kids Cool Down	2023	Kidz Bop Kidz	Composer
Give Thanks	2023	Kidz Bop Kidz	Composer
Classroom Thanksgiving Party	2023	Kidz Bop Kidz	Composer
Be Thankful	2023	Kidz Bop Kidz	Composer
Autumn Trips	2023	Kidz Bop Kidz	Composer
A Merry Lofi Christmas	2023	Forrest Frank	Main artist
Valentines Day Classroom Party	2024	Kidz Bop Kidz	Composer
The Maverick Way Reimagined	2024	Maverick City Music	Composer
Teacher Appreciation Classroom Party	2024	Kidz Bop Kidz	Composer
Kids Birthday Bash	2024	Kidz Bop Kidz	Composer
Kidz Bop 42	2024	Kidz Bop Kidz	Composer
Child of God	2024	Forrest Frank	Main artist
Celebrate Mother's Day	2024	Kidz Bop Kidz	Composer
Child of God II	2025	Forrest Frank	Main artist

== See also ==
- Forrest Frank discography
