= Party Wave (band) =

American Christian music superduo

- Also known as: Dawn Patrol (2025–2026)
- Genre: Christian music
- Years active: 2025–present
- Label: River House
- Spinoff of: Surfaces; Mission Six
- Members: Forrest Frank; Noah Hayden

Party Wave, formerly Dawn Patrol, is an American Christian music superduo composed of Forrest Frank and Noah Hayden. The group is signed to River House Records and has been active since 2025. They released their debut single, "SOS" on March 27, 2026. Their debut studio album, Dawn Patrol, was released on April 8, 2026.

== Background ==
Both Frank and Hayden had solo careers in the Christian music industry predating Party Wave's formation. Frank rose to fame as one half of the pop duo Surfaces. In 2024, Frank began seeing noteworthy solo success as a performer of Christian music. He completed 2025 having two Billboard Hot 100-charted hits, "Your Way's Better" and "Lemonade", the former of which was certified RIAA gold and received the GMA Dove Award for Pop/Contemporary Recorded Song of the Year. His breakout solo effort, 2024's Child of God, also received the gold certification. Hayden had a less active solo career predating Party Wave, although was active as frontman of a Christian boy band, Mission Six, from 2008 until 2015. He left Mission Six after high school to pursue college education. Hayden had also collaborated as a writer on several tracks from Frank's eighth studio album, Child of God II, in 2025.

== History ==
Party Wave was formed in September 2025 under the name Dawn Patrol. On March 27, 2026, the duo was announced alongside the release of "SOS" as their debut single. It was also announced that Frank had left his previous band, Surfaces, to pursue work with Party Wave. The full album, Dawn Patrol, was made available for preorder, while its second single, "Waste Some Time", was scheduled for upcoming release. Less than a week following the release of "SOS", the duo sought to change their name after finding that another band had already owned copyright on the name "Dawn Patrol". Asking fans for name suggestions, the duo offered $10,000 to whomever's name suggestion would be chosen. They settled upon the name "Party Wave". Dawn Patrol, the duo's debut studio album, was released on April 8, 2026.

== Music style ==
Jesus Freak Hideout described the duo's sound as resembling "early mornings in the water, deep conversations, prayer and a shared desire to make something honest and unfiltered". In comparison to Frank's previous work, the style was considered to be "more laid-back" and containing a "sun-soaked sonic palette". GodTube described the band's style as "deeply personal" and "refreshingly unpolished".

== Members ==
- Forrest Frank – programming, lead vocals (2025–present)
- Noah Hayden – programming, lead vocals (2025–present)

== Discography ==
=== Studio albums ===
Title	Details	Peak chart positions
Title	Details	US Christ.
Dawn Patrol	Releasing: April 8, 2026; Label: River House; Formats: CD, LP, digital download, streaming	4

=== Singles ===
Title	Year	Peak chart positions		Album
Title	Year	US Christ.	UK Christ. Air.	Album
"SOS"	2026	23	2	Dawn Patrol
"Waste Some Time"	2026	25	—	Dawn Patrol
"Something in the Water"	2026	29	—	Dawn Patrol
"—" denotes a recording that did not chart or was not released in that territory.

=== Promotional singles ===
Title	Year	Peak chart positions		Album
Title	Year	US Christ.	US Christ. Digital	Album
"Yahweh"	2026	20	10	Dawn Patrol

== See also ==
- List of musical supergroups
