= The Rock (Forrest Frank and Crowder song) =

Single by Forrest Frank and Crowder

from the album Child of God II (Back to Back) Deluxe
- Released: August 22, 2025
- Genre: rhythmic; worship; pop music; rock; Christian/gospel
- Length: 2:48
- Label: River House; 10K
- Songwriters: Frank; David Crowder
- Producer: Frank

Forrest Frank singles chronology
"Selah" (2025)	"The Rock" (2025)	"Jesus Is Coming Back Soon" (2025)

Crowder singles chronology
"— (Dash)" (2024)	"The Rock" (2025)	"It Really Is Amazing Grace" (2026)

"The Rock" is a song recorded by Forrest Frank and David Crowder. The song was released as a single on August 22, 2025, via River House Records and Ten Thousand Projects.

== Background ==
On August 6, 2025, Crowder announced via Instagram that he would need "emergency surgery" as a result of breaking his leg. Frank responded to the post, commenting that, "You might not be able to stand, but you can stand on the rock!", and creating a song by that theme.

== Recording and production ==
"The Rock" was written by Frank and Crowder, with both musicians recording lead vocals. Frank produced and programmed, while Jacob "Biz" Morris mastered and mixed. The song is composed in the key of A♭, with a tempo of 130 beats per minute and a time signature of 4/4.

== Style ==
"The Rock" features a combination of Frank's "modern, rhythmic" style as well as Crowder's "rustic worship sound". The song demonstrates genres of pop, rock, and Christian/gospel.

== Commercial performance ==
"The Rock" debuted at No. 1 on the Billboard Christian Digital Song Sales and No. 9 on the Christian Streaming Songs, leading it to peak at No. 6 on the Hot Christian Songs and No. 4 on the Digital Song Sales.

== Personnel ==
Credits adapted from Tidal Music.

- David Crowder – lead vocals, writer
- Forrest Frank – producer, programmer, lead vocals, writer
- Jacob "Biz" Morris – masterer, mixer

== Charts ==
=== Weekly ===
Weekly chart performance for "The Rock"
Chart (2025–2026)	Peak position
Australian Christian Songs (TCM)	23
US Christian Songs (Billboard)	6
US Digital Song Sales (Billboard)	4

=== Year-end ===
Year-end chart performance for "The Rock"
Chart (2025)	Position
US Hot Christian Songs (Billboard)	86

== Release history ==
Release history for "The Rock"
Region	Release	Date	Format	Label	Ref.
Various	"The Rock"	August 1, 2025	Digital download; streaming	River House Records; 10K Projects	
Various	Child of God II (Back to Back) Deluxe	September 5, 2025	CD; LP; digital download; streaming	River House Records; 10K Projects	
