= Heaven on My Mind =

Heaven on My Mind may refer to:

- Heaven on My Mind (film), a 2018 Nigerian film
- "Heaven on My Mind" (Becky Hill and Sigala song), a 2020 song by British singer-songwriter Becky Hill and record producer Sigala
- Heaven on My Mind (album), a 2025 album by tobyMac
  - "Heaven On My Mind" (tobyMac and Forrest Frank song), the album's title track
