= Thankful (Forrest Frank song) =

Single by Forrest Frank
- Released: December 12, 2025
- Genre: Pop; rock
- Length: 2:16
- Label: River House; 10K/Warner; Atlantic
- Songwriter: Frank
- Producer: Frank

Forrest Frank singles chronology
"Keep It Simple" (2025)	"Thankful" (2025)	"2026" (2026)

"Thankful" is a song recorded by the American Christian pop and hip hop musician Forrest Frank. The song was officially released as a single on December 12, 2025, to digital download and streaming formats, via River House Records, Ten Thousand Projects/Warner Music Group, and Atlantic Music Group. It was written, produced, and mixed by Frank, and engineered and mastered by Jacob "Biz" Morris.

== Background ==
"Thankful" was released in support of Frank's Jesus Generation Tour of 2026. The tour, featuring supporting acts Tori Kelly, Cory Asbury, and The Figs, had sold nearly 500,000 tickets at the time of the song's release. The song was also released to celebrate Frank's record-breaking dominance on the Billboard charts in 2025. Between the release of his albums Child of God (2024) and Child of God II (2025), by the time of the song's release, Frank had maintained the longest consecutive time spent at number 1 on the Billboard Top Christian Albums chart. He had completed the year earning thirty-nine entries into the Hot Christian Songs chart, eleven of which were top-ten entries.

== Writing and development ==
"Thankful" was written in the key of F sharp, with a speed of 70 beats per minute and a time signature of 4/4. It demonstrates the styles of pop and rock music.

== Commercial performance ==
For the chart week dated to December 27, 2025, "Thankful" debuted at numbers 7 and 15 on the Billboard Hot Christian Songs and Digital Song Sales charts, respectively. It additionally debuted at number 25 on the Christian Streaming Songs, and number 1 on the Christian Digital Song Sales, where it led for three weeks. The song later reached peak positions of number 6 on the Hot Christian Songs chart and number 18 on the Christian Streaming Songs.

== Personnel ==
Credits adapted from Tidal Music.

- Forrest Frank – producer, writer, mixer, programmer, vocalist
- Jacob "Biz" Morris – engineer, masterer

== Charts ==
Chart performance for "Thankful"
Chart (2025–2026)	Peak position
Australian Christian Songs (TCM)	2
US Adult Pop Airplay (Billboard)	26
US Christian Adult Contemporary (Billboard)	25
US Christian Airplay (Billboard)	28
US Digital Song Sales (Billboard)	15
US Hot Christian Songs (Billboard)	6
