= Your Way's Better =

Single by Forrest Frank

from the album Child of God (Deluxe) and Child of God II
- Released: October 25, 2024
- Genre: Pop; hip-hop; gospel
- Length: 3:18
- Label: River House Records; 10K Projects; Warner Music Group
- Songwriters: Forrest Frank; Pera Krstajić
- Producers: Frank; Krstajić

Forrest Frank singles chronology
| "Never Get Used to This" (2024) | "Your Way's Better" (2024) | "The Present" (2024) |

Music video
- "Your Way's Better" on YouTube

"Your Way's Better" is a song by American pop and hip-hop musician Forrest Frank, which appeared as the lead single from his 2025 studio album Child of God II. The song was released on October 25, 2024, through River House Records, 10K Projects, and Warner Music Group. It peaked at No. 61 on the Billboard Hot 100 and No. 1 on the Hot Christian Songs. It is one of only four Christian songs to enter the Hot 100 in the 2020s.

On July 22, 2025, the song was certified gold by the Recording Industry Association of America.

== Composition and lyrics ==
"Your Way's Better" was both written and produced by Forrest Frank and Pera Krstajić. The song is composed in the key of G with a tempo of 73 beats per minute. At 2:05, the key is raised by a semitone into the key of Ab.

In an interview with Billboard, when asked about the inspiration behind the song, Frank said:

I was having a hard day and had gone for a drive. I remember pulling into my neighborhood and that chorus came spilling out. It was just a prayer that ended up having a melody with it. I recorded a voice memo of it on my phone and didn’t do anything with it for a few months. Then, backstage at [Frank’s 2024 Child of God tour], I pulled out my laptop and produced the beat for it. Then, my producer friend PERA came out to a session and we were jamming on this song and I said, “What if you play something kind of somber?” He starts playing it, and I freestyled the melody [and] some of the words that ended up on the track.

"Your Way's Better" reflects the genres of pop, hip hop, and gospel.

== Release ==
"Your Way's Better" was released as a single on October 25, 2024. On November 1, 2024, it appeared on the deluxe edition of Frank's album Child of God.

On April 13, 2025, an official lyric video was released. On May 9, 2025, the song appeared on Frank's studio album Child of God II.

On July 2, 2025, Reach Records' hip-hop musician 1K Phew released a cover of the song, titled "Your Way".

== Accolades ==
| Year | Organization | Category | Result | Ref. |
|---|---|---|---|---|
| 2025 | GMA Dove Awards | Pop/Contemporary Recorded Song of the Year | Won | |
| 2026 | Grammy Awards | Best Contemporary Christian Music Performance/Song | Nominated | |
| 2026 | ASCAP Awards | Christian Song of the Year | Won | |

== Commercial performance ==
Within its first charting week, "Your Way's Better" debuted at No. 19 on the Billboard Hot Christian Songs. Within the first several months of release, "Your Way's Better" remained as Frank's 12th or 13th most popular song on DSPs. In February 2025, a TikTok dance-trend based around the song was created by social media personnel David Myers and Bridgette Nicole. The trend caused the song to greatly increase in popularity. The song hit the TikTok Top 50 chart at number 41 on the week of April 16, 2025.

A week later, it started at No. 8 on the "Bubbling Under" of the Billboard Hot 100, entering the chart proper at No. 72 the week afterwards; it reached number 61. The song's performance was supported significantly by downloads, as it peaked at number two on the Hot 100's Digital Song Sales component chart. On July 22, 2025, the song was certified gold.

The entry marked Frank's second Hot 100 entry, his first being "Sunday Best" with Surfaces, which peaked at No. 19 in 2020. "Your Way's Better" was his first entry as a solo artist. The song was on the chart alongside Brandon Lake's "Hard Fought Hallelujah", making it the second time that two Christian songs appeared on the Hot 100 at the same time, the first being in 2014. In August 2025, Frank's song "Lemonade" appeared on the Hot 100 as well, marking the first tie that three Christian songs have been on the chart at once. The song itself was among Google's most hummed-to-search tracks of 2025.

The song topped the Hot Christian Songs, becoming 2025's second-best-performing on the chart, and two of its components for downloads and streaming. Frank garnered the highest quantity of entries on the Christian chart of any artist in 2025, 39, with 11 being in the top-ten. It also did well on Christian radio stations, peaking at No. 3 on both the Christian Airplay and Christian AC Airplay charts. The song's vitality also propelled Child of God to become number one on the Top Christian Albums chart, remaining at that spot for a record-breaking amount of weeks, while Child of God II was at number two.

== Track listing ==
| No. | Title | Writer(s) | Producer(s) | Length |
|---|---|---|---|---|
| 1. | "Your Way's Better" | Forrest Frank; Pera Krstajić | Forrest Frank; Pera Krstajić | 3:18 |
| 2. | "Your Way's Better" (shorter) | Forrest Frank; Pera Krstajić | Forrest Frank; Pera Krstajić | 2:32 |
| Total length: | | | | 5:50 |

== Personnel ==
Adapted from Tidal.

- Amanda Bradshaw – choir
- Forrest Frank – producer, programmer, writer, lead vocals
- Grace Pehrman – choir
- Pera Krstajić – producer, mixing
- Roy Boukris – masterer, mixing, programmer, writer
- Tyler Christian – choir

== Charts ==
=== Weekly charts ===
Weekly chart performance for "Your Way's Better"
| Chart (2024–2025) | Peak position |
|---|---|
| Australia Christian Airplay (TCM) | 2 |
| Japan Hot Overseas (Billboard Japan) | 6 |
| UK Independent Singles (OCC) | 18 |
| US Billboard Hot 100 | 61 |
| US Christian Airplay (Billboard) | 3 |
| US Hot Christian Songs (Billboard) | 1 |

=== Year-end charts ===
Year-end chart performance for "Your Way's Better"
| Chart (2025) | Position |
|---|---|
| Australian Christian Airplay (TCM) | 13 |
| US Hot Christian Songs (Billboard) | 2 |
| US Christian Airplay (Billboard) | 14 |
| US Christian Adult Contemporary (Billboard) | 17 |

== Certifications ==
| Region | Certification | Certified units/sales |
|---|---|---|
| New Zealand (RMNZ) | Gold | 15,000^{‡} |
| United States (RIAA) | Gold | 500,000^{‡} |
^{‡} Sales+streaming figures based on certification alone.

== Release history ==
Release history for "Your Way's Better"
| Region | Version | Release | Date | Format | Label | Ref. |
|---|---|---|---|---|---|---|
| Various | Original; Shortened | "Your Way's Better" | October 25, 2024 | Digital download; streaming | River House Records; 10K Projects; Warner Music Group | |
| Various | Original | Child of God (Deluxe) | November 1, 2024 | Digital download; streaming | River House Records; 10K Projects; Warner Music Group | |
| Various | Original | Child of God II | May 9, 2025 | Digital download; streaming; CD; LP | River House Records; 10K Projects; Warner Music Group | |
| Various | Original | Child of God II (Back to Back) Deluxe | September 5, 2025 | Digital download; streaming; CD; LP | River House Records; 10K Projects; Warner Music Group | |
