= Thankful =

Thankful may refer to:

- Gratitude or thankfulness
- Thankful (Aaron Pritchett album), 2008
- Thankful (Flavour N'abania album), 2014
- Thankful (Kelly Clarkson album), 2003
- Thankful (Mary Mary album), 2000
- Thankful (Natalie Cole album), 1977
- "Thankful", a song by Forrest Frank, 2025
- Thankful, an album by Jennifer Hanson, 2008
- "Thankful", a song by Celine Dion from the album Loved Me Back to Life, 2013
- "Thankful", a song by The Louvin Brothers from Nearer My God to Thee, 1957
- "Thankful", a song by Ringo Starr from the album Look Up, 2025
- "Thankful", a song by Glen Phillips from the album Winter Pays for Summer, 2005

== See also ==
- Thanks (disambiguation)
- Thank You (disambiguation)
