= Nothing Else (Forrest Frank and Thomas Rhett song) =

Single by Forrest Frank and Thomas Rhett

from the album Child of God II
- Released: February 28, 2025
- Length: 1:58
- Label: River House
- Songwriter: Forrest Frank
- Producer: Forrest Frank

Forrest Frank singles chronology
| "Sunrise" (2025) | "Nothing Else" (2025) | "Heaven On My Mind" (2025) |

Thomas Rhett singles chronology
| "After All the Bars Are Closed" (2025) | "Nothing Else" (2025) | "Ain't a Bad Life" (2025) |

"Nothing Else" is a song by Forrest Frank, an American pop and hip-hop musician and country singer Thomas Rhett. The song was released on River House Records on February 28, 2025.

== Background ==
Frank and Rhett have released two songs. "Nothing Else" was the second song and "C'est La Vie" by Surfaces was the first one. It is the first collaborative single by Frank since "Never Get Used to This", which featured Jvke.

== Style ==
The song has been said to be "funky and upbeat". Billboard described it as "breezy, poppy, summertime jam" about "being grateful for the small joys in life". Lyrically, the song is Christian-based.

== Charts ==
=== Weekly ===
Weekly chart performance for "Nothing Else"
| Chart (2025–2026) | Peak position |
|---|---|
| Australian Christian Airplay (TCM) | 5 |
| NZ Hot Singles (Recorded Music NZ) | 31 |
| US Christian Airplay (Billboard) | 29 |
| US Christian Hip Hop Airplay (GMA) | 24 |
| US Digital Song Sales (Billboard) | 14 |
| US Hot Christian Songs (Billboard) | 4 |

=== Year-end ===
Year-end chart performance for "Nothing Else"
| Chart (2025) | Position |
|---|---|
| Australian Christian Airplay (TCM) | 18 |
| US Christian Songs (Billboard) | 12 |
