= I Thank You =

I Thank You may refer to:

- "I Thank You" (song), a 1968 song by Sam & Dave, covered by ZZ Top
- "I Thank You", a 1969 song by Australian bantamweight boxer Lionel Rose
- "I Thank You", a 1989 song by Adeva
- "I Thank You", a 2003 song by Rebecca St. James
- "I Thank You", a 2013 song by The Tenors
- I Thank You (film), a 1941 film directed by Marcel Varnel
  - A catchphrase associated with Arthur Askey who starred in the film

== See also ==
- Thank You (disambiguation)
