= Sunrise (Forrest Frank song) =

Single by Forrest Frank
- Released: February 7, 2025
- Length: 2:37
- Label: River House Records
- Songwriter: Forrest Frank
- Producer: Forrest Frank

Forrest Frank singles chronology
"Drop!" (2025)	"Sunrise" (2025)	"Nothing Else" (2025)

Music video
- "Sunrise" on YouTube

"Sunrise" (stylized in all caps) is a single by Forrest Frank, an American hip-hop and lo-fi singer and musician. The song was released on February 7, 2025, through his independent record label River House Records. It was written and produced by Forrest Frank.

== Music video ==
After its release the song was supported by a music video. The video is a lyric video, featuring Frank singing and showing the lyrics.

== Charts ==
=== Weekly ===
Weekly chart performance for "Sunrise"
Chart (2025)	Peak position
US Hot Christian Songs (Billboard)	20
NZ Most Added (RMNZ)	40

=== Year-end ===
Year-end chart performance for "Sunrise"
Chart (2025)	Position
US Hot Christian Songs (Billboard)	72
