= Thank You =

Thank you is a common expression of gratitude.

Thank You or Thank U may also refer to:

== Film and television ==
=== Films ===
- Thank You (1925 film), an American film directed by John Ford
- Thank You (2011 film), a Bollywood romantic comedy
- Thank You (2013 film), a Malayalam drama thriller
- Thank You (2022 film), an Indian Telugu-language film

=== Television ===
- Thank You (TV series), 2007 South Korean television series
- "Thank You", series episode of Adventure Time season 3
- "Thank You" (The Walking Dead), series episode

== Music ==
=== Albums ===
- Thank You (Declan Galbraith album), 2006
- Thank You (Diana Ross album) or the title song, 2021
- Thank You (Duran Duran album) or the title song, 1995
- Thank You (Jamelia album) or the title song (see below), 2003
- Thank You (Meghan Trainor album) or the title song, 2016
- Thank You (Mike D album), 2026
- Thank You (Royal Trux album), 1995
- Thank You (Stone Temple Pilots album), 2003
- Thank You (For Letting Us Be Ourselves), by Hardcore Superstar, 2001
- Thank You...Goodnight!, by Great White, 2002
- Thank U (album), by CNBLUE, 2010
- Thank You, by Michael Schenker, 1993
- Thank You, by Monkey Majik, 2006
- Thank You, by Nicoleta Alexandru, 2009
- Thank You, by Puffy AmiYumi, 2011
- Thank You or the title song, by Ray Boltz, 1988

=== EPs ===
- Thank You (Brave Girls EP) or the title song (see below), 2022
- Thank You (Jamala EP), or the title song, 2014
- Thank You, by Bombadil, 2012
- Thank You, by Shaun Fleming, 2011

=== Songs ===
- "Thank You" (Amy Diamond song), 2008
- "Thank You" (Bow Wow song), 2001
- "Thank You" (Boyz II Men song), 1995
- "Thank You" (Brave Girls song), 2022
- "Thank You" (Busta Rhymes song), 2013
- "Thank You" (Dido song), 1998
- "Thank You" (Estelle song), 2011
- "Thank You" (Hellyeah song), 2008
- "Thank You" (Jamelia song), 2004
- "Thank You" (Led Zeppelin song), 1969
- "Thank You" (Lena Meyer-Landrut song), 2019
- "Thank You" (MKTO song), 2012
- "Thank You" (Sevendust song), 2015
- "Thank You (Falettinme Be Mice Elf Agin)", by Sly and the Family Stone, 1969
- "Thank You (for Loving Me at My Worst)", by The Whitlams, 1999
- "Thank U", by Alanis Morissette, 1998
- "Thank You", by Alcazar from Disco Defenders
- "Thank You", by Amanda Lear
- "Thank You", by Ana Moura from Desfado, originally by David Poe
- "Thank You", by Angie Stone from Black Diamond
- "Thank You", by Ben Rector from The Joy of Music
- "Thank You", by Bobby Womack from My Prescription
- "Thank You", by Bobbysocks!
- "Thank You", by Bonnie Raitt from Bonnie Raitt
- "Thank You", by Brandon Lake from Help!
- "Thank You", by the Calling from Camino Palmero
- "Thank You", by Chris Brown from Chris Brown
- "Thank You", by Chris Cornell from Songbook
- "Thank You", by Celine Dion from Loved Me Back to Life
- "Thank You", by Clairo from Charm
- "Thank You", by Commodores from Rock Solid
- "Thank You", by Gentle Giant from Giant for a Day!
- "Thank You", by Gotthard from Bang!
- "Thank You", by Helen Reddy from Ear Candy
- "Thank You", by Ice Prince from Everybody Loves Ice Prince
- "Thank You", by Jane Child from Jane Child
- "Thank You", by Jay-Z from The Blueprint 3
- "Thank You", by Johnny Reid from Kicking Stones
- "Thank You", by Kehlani from SweetSexySavage
- "Thank You", by Keith Urban from Defying Gravity
- "Thank You", by KMFDM from Money
- "Thank You", by Leona Lewis from I Am
- "Thank You", by Logic from YSIV
- "Thank You", by Lou Bega from Lounatic
- "Thank You", by Mary Mary from Incredible
- "Thank You", by Mike Posner from At Night, Alone
- "Thank You", by Nicky Byrne from Sunlight
- "Thank You", by Noni Răzvan Ene
- "Thank You", by Norman Bedard
- "Thank You", by the Pale Fountains
- "Thank You", by Paul Kelly from The Merri Soul Sessions
- "Thank You", by Paul Revere & The Raiders from Alias Pink Puzz
- "Thank You", by Philip Bailey from Triumph
- "Thank You", by Psy from PsyFive
- "Thank You", by Pvris from Use Me
- "Thank You", by Ray J from Everything You Want
- "Thank You", by Ray Stevens
- "Thank You", by the Redwalls from De Nova
- "Thank You", by Roscoe, featuring Kendrick Lamar
- "Thank You", by Sarah Connor from Naughty but Nice
- "Thank You", by Sasha Alex Sloan from I Blame the World
- "Thank You", by Shaggy from Shaggy & Friends
- "Thank You", by Shinhwa from Winter Story
- "Thank You", by Simple Plan from Still Not Getting Any...
- "Thank You", by Simply Red from Love and the Russian Winter
- "Thank You", by Sister Hazel from Fortress
- "Thank You", by the Slackers from The Great Rocksteady Swindle
- "Thank You", by Strawbs from Bursting at the Seams
- "Thank You", by Super Junior from Don't Don
- "Thank You", by Swans from Filth
- "Thank You", by Westlife from Turnaround
- "Thank You", by the Wilkinsons from Home
- "Thank You", by Will Young from 85% Proof
- "Thank You", by Willie Nelson from Angel Eyes
- "Thank You", by Xzibit from Full Circle
- "Thank You", by Yolanda Adams from Believe
- "Thank You (Dedication to Fans...)", by Christina Aguilera from Back to Basics
- "Thank U", by Ayumi Hamasaki from Love Songs
- "Thank You Song", by FKA Twigs from Caprisongs
- "Thank U", by U-Know Yunho from Noir, 2021
- "Thank U", by Ive from Ive Empathy, 2025

== See also ==
- "Gone, Gone / Thank You", a song by Tyler, the Creator, 2020
- Letter of thanks
- I Thank You (disambiguation)
- Thankful (disambiguation)
- Thanks (disambiguation)
- Gratitude
- Thank You, I'm Sorry (disambiguation)
