= Bob Sheets =

American meteorologist (born 1937)

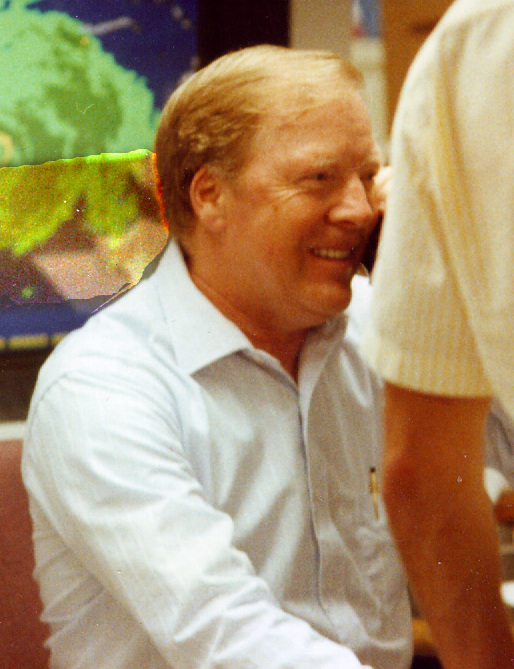
- Born: June 7, 1937 (age 88); Fairmount, Indiana, U.S.
- Education: Fairmount High School, Fairmount, Indiana, U.S.
- Alma mater: Ball State University; University of Oklahoma
- Occupation(s): Former director of the National Hurricane Center; meteorologist

Robert Chester Sheets (born June 7, 1937) is an American meteorologist who served as the director of the National Hurricane Center from 1987 to 1995. He was born in Marion, Indiana.

He is well remembered for numerous interviews given from the Hurricane Center during Hurricane Andrew in 1992. Sheets was a member and eventual director in Project Storm Fury, an attempt to modify hurricanes with silver iodide.

Since retiring in 1995, Sheets has continued his relationship with the media, becoming a special-situation hurricane analyst with ABC network affiliates in Florida.

He has also co-authored a book, Hurricane Watch: Forecasting the Deadliest Storms on Earth, on hurricane information and stories.

Preceded by Neil Frank	Director of the National Hurricane Center; 1987–1995	Succeeded by Bob Burpee
