= Sunday Best (Surfaces song) =

2019 single by Surfaces

- Live version cover

Single by Surfaces

from the album Where the Light Is
- Released: January 8, 2019
- Recorded: November 29, 2017
- Length: 2:39
- Label: TenThousand Projects; Caroline
- Songwriters: Forrest Frank; Colin Padalecki
- Producers: Forrest Frank; Colin Padalecki

Surfaces singles chronology
"Heaven Falls / Fall on Me" (2018)	"Sunday Best" (2019)	"Palm Trees" (2019)

Surfaces singles chronology
"Lazy" (2020)	"Sunday Best" (re-release) (2020)	"Learn to Fly" (2020)

Music video
- "Sunday Best" on YouTube

"Sunday Best" is a song by American electro-pop duo Surfaces, consisting of Forrest Frank and Colin Padalecki. The song was released by TenThousand Projects and Caroline Records on January 8, 2019, as the third single from the duo's second studio album, Where the Light Is. The song's music video was released on July 11, 2019, and features the duo turning a boring office into a party place.

The song is believed to have gained popularity in late February 2020 (one year after its release) on the online-video sharing platform TikTok for its lyric "Feeling good, like I should", before it was released for radio airplay in early March 2020. The song peaked in the top 40 in Australia, Canada, Norway, Ireland, New Zealand, the UK and the United States, as well as the top 100 in Switzerland, Germany and Sweden.

== Music video ==
After the discovery that every day on the calendar is Sunday, a dull office is livened up by the entrance of Forrest and Colin, who introduce an extravagant, brightly colored Hawaiian theme to the room featuring a barbecue, cool drinks, and an inflatable flamingo floatie, beginning a dance party amongst the office staff. The video was released on July 10, 2019.

== Lyrical interpretation ==
Despite many believing that the song was about carefree life with no problems, Frank said that it was not the case. He said "I see in the comments, sometimes people are like, 'This song is for people that never have anything bad happen to them’... [I]magine you go through the darkest stuff of your life, like depression, anxiety or suicide...things that are really tough. It's like getting out of that and seeing the light of day and accepting who you are and accepting your situation and saying, 'I'm going to just breathe this air and have a good day.' And that's really where that song came from."

== Live performances ==
Surfaces made their late-night television debut when they performed the song on Late Night with Seth Meyers on March 2, 2020.

== Charts ==
=== Weekly charts ===
Weekly chart performance for "Sunday Best"
Chart (2020)	Peak position
Australia (ARIA)	10
Austria (Ö3 Austria Top 40)	51
Belgium (Ultratop 50 Flanders)	11
Belgium (Ultratop 50 Wallonia)	18
Canada Hot 100 (Billboard)	8
Canada CHR/Top 40 (Billboard)	14
Canada Hot AC (Billboard)	23
Czech Republic Airplay (ČNS IFPI)	54
Czech Republic Singles Digital (ČNS IFPI)	9
Denmark (Tracklisten)	11
Estonia (Eesti Tipp-40)	18
France (SNEP)	29
Germany (GfK)	50
Global 200 (Billboard)	102
Hungary (Stream Top 40)	25
Ireland (IRMA)	19
Italy (FIMI)	49
Lithuania (AGATA)	17
Malaysia (RIM)	13
Mexico Ingles Airplay (Billboard)	30
Netherlands (Single Top 100)	35
New Zealand (Recorded Music NZ)	9
Norway (VG-lista)	21
Portugal (AFP)	23
Romania (Airplay 100)	65
Singapore (RIAS)	17
Slovakia Singles Digital (ČNS IFPI)	18
Sweden (Sverigetopplistan)	33
Switzerland (Schweizer Hitparade)	23
UK Singles (OCC)	36
US Billboard Hot 100	19
US Adult Pop Airplay (Billboard)	13
US Christian Hot AC/CHR (Billboard)	21
US Dance/Mix Show Airplay (Billboard)	31
US Pop Airplay (Billboard)	9
US Rolling Stone Top 100	18

=== Year-end charts ===
Year-end chart performance for "Sunday Best"
Chart (2020)	Position
Australia (ARIA)	32
Belgium (Ultratop Flanders)	46
Belgium (Ultratop Wallonia)	87
Canada (Canadian Hot 100)	30
France (SNEP)	153
New Zealand (Recorded Music NZ)	27
Switzerland (Schweizer Hitparade)	65
US Billboard Hot 100	61
US Adult Top 40 (Billboard)	37
US Mainstream Top 40 (Billboard)	31

== Certifications ==
Certifications and sales for "Sunday Best"
Region	Certification	Certified units/sales
Australia (ARIA)	2× Platinum	140,000^{‡}
Belgium (BRMA)	Platinum	40,000^{‡}
Brazil (Pro-Música Brasil)	Diamond	160,000^{‡}
Canada (Music Canada)	4× Platinum	320,000^{‡}
Denmark (IFPI Danmark)	Gold	45,000^{‡}
France (SNEP)	Platinum	200,000^{‡}
Italy (FIMI)	Gold	35,000^{‡}
New Zealand (RMNZ)	3× Platinum	90,000^{‡}
Poland (ZPAV)	Platinum	50,000^{‡}
Portugal (AFP)	Platinum	10,000^{‡}
Spain (Promusicae)	Gold	30,000^{‡}
Switzerland (IFPI Switzerland)	Platinum	20,000^{‡}
United Kingdom (BPI)	Gold	400,000^{‡}
United States (RIAA)	3× Platinum	3,000,000^{‡}
^{‡} Sales+streaming figures based on certification alone.
