= Never Get Used to This =

Single by Forrest Frank and Jvke

from the album Child of God
- Released: July 9, 2024
- Length: 2:35
- Songwriters: Forrest Frank; Jvke; Jackson Foote; Johnny Simpson; Zach Lawson; Nicky Yore
- Producers: Forrest Frank; Jvke; Jackson Foote; Johnny Simpson; Zack Lawson

Forrest Frank singles chronology
"Beautiful as Ever" (2024)	"Never Get Used to This" (2024)	"Your Way's Better" (2024)

Jvke singles chronology
"Mi Amor" (2024)	"Never Get Used to This" (2024)	"Her" (2024)

"Never Get Used to This" is a song by American Christian contemporary musician Forrest Frank and rapper JVKE. The song was included on Frank's album Child of God. It was released on July 9, 2024. Lyrically, the song expresses gratitude towards being saved. The song was released with an extended play by the same title, which featured five additional bonus tracks.

== Writing and production ==
The song was written by Forrest Frank, Jvke, Jackson Foote, Johnny Simpson, Zack Lawson, and Nicky Yore. It was produced by Frank, Jvke, Foote, Simpson, and Lawson, and mixed and mastered by Jacob Morris.

== Track listing ==
Song only
No.	Title	Writer(s)	Producer(s)	Length
1.	"Never Get Used to This" (with Jvke)	Forrest Frank; Jvke; Jackson Foote; Johnny Simpson; Zach Lawson; Nicky Yore	Frank; Jvke; Foote; Simpson; Lawson	2:35
Total length:				2:35

Extended play
No.	Title	Writer(s)	Producer(s)	Length
1.	"Never Get Used to This" (with Jvke)	Forrest Frank; Jvke; Jackson Foote; Johnny Simpson; Zach Lawson; Nicky Yore	Frank; Jvke; Foote; Simpson; Lawson	2:35
2.	"Good Day"	Frank	Frank	2:50
3.	"Always"	Frank	Frank	2:38
4.	"Up!" (with Connor Price)	Frank; Connor Price	Frank	2:16
5.	"God Is Good" (with Caleb Gordon)	Frank; Caleb Gordon	Frank	3:27
6.	"No Longer Bound" (with Hulvey)	Frank; Christopher Hulvey	Frank	3:00
Total length:				16:38

== Charts ==
=== Weekly charts ===
Weekly chart performance for "Never Get Used to This"
Chart (2024)	Peak position
New Zealand Hot Singles (RMNZ)	39
US Christian Adult Contemporary (Billboard)	25
US Christian Airplay (Billboard)	25
US Hot Christian Songs (Billboard)	6

=== Year-end charts ===
Year-end chart performance for "Never Get Used to This"
Chart (2024)	Position
US Hot Christian Songs (Billboard)	32
Chart (2025)	Position
US Christian Adult Contemporary (Billboard)	46
US Hot Christian Songs (Billboard)	25
