= Thanks =

Thanks may refer to:

- Thank you, a common expression of gratitude

== Film and television ==
- Thanks (film), a 2011 American film
- Thanks (TV series), a 1999 American sitcom

== Music ==
=== Albums ===
- Thanks, by J. Vincent Edwards, 1969
- Thanks, by Ivan Neville, 1994
- Thanks, by Marty Grosz, 1997
- Thanks, by w-inds., 2006

=== Songs ===
- "Thanks" (song), 1969, recorded by J. Vincent Edwards and Bill Anderson
- "Thanks!" (GAM song), 2006
- "Thanks", by the James Gang from James Gang Rides Again, 1970
- "Thanks", by Judith Allen and by Bing Crosby from the Too Much Harmony soundtrack, 1933
- "Thanks", by Waylon Jennings from Ladies Love Outlaws, 1972

== See also ==
- Thankful (disambiguation)
- Thank God (disambiguation)
- Thank You (disambiguation)
