= Jesus Is Coming Back Soon =

Single by Forrest Frank and Josiah Queen

from the album Damascus Road
- Released: October 3, 2025
- Genre: Pop; rock; Christian
- Length: 3:00
- Label: River House; 10K/Warner; Capitol CMG
- Songwriters: Dylan Thomas; Frank; Queen; Zac Lawson
- Producers: Thomas; Frank; Lawson

Forrest Frank singles chronology
"The Rock" (2025)	"Jesus Is Coming Back Soon" (2025)	"Keep It Simple" (2025)

Josiah Queen singles chronology
"I'll Fly Away" (2025)	"Jesus Is Coming Back Soon" (2025)	"Demons" (2026)

Music video
- "Jesus Is Coming Back Soon" on YouTube

"Jesus Is Coming Back Soon" is a song recorded by Forrest Frank featuring Josiah Queen. The song was released as a single on October 3, 2025, via River House Records, Ten Thousand Projects/Warner Music Group, and Capitol Christian Music Group. The song was released as a response to the assassination of Charlie Kirk. It was written by Frank, Queen, Dylan Thomas, and Zac Lawson, and produced by Frank, Thomas, and Lawson.

The song peaked at No. 22 on the Recorded Music NZ Hot Singles chart, No. 6 on the Hot Christian Songs chart, and No. 3 on the Digital Song Sales chart.

== Background ==
"Jesus Is Coming Back Soon" was first teased on September 16, 2025. Shortly following the assassination of political activist Charlie Kirk, Frank spoke on the topic via social media, referencing the return of Jesus, saying:

He's coming back real soon. So if you have not gotten your heart right with Him and dropped down on your knees and repented to him. Today is the day. The hour is at hand. I don't know if you can feel it too. There's a heaviness, something shifted, and I don't care. I don't care anymore. I just want you to know that Jesus Christ is here and He loves you.

On the video, Frank teased a song demo for "Jesus Is Coming Back Soon". It saw mixed reception from audiences, achieving over one million likes, as well as causing Frank to lose 30,000 followers.

On October 2, 2025, it was announced that Queen would be featured on the song. It was officially released on October 3, supported by a lyric video.

== Writing and composition ==
The initial demo of the song, teased to social media on September 16, 2025, featured Frank performing the song on a keyboard.

"Jesus Is Coming Back Soon" was written by Frank, Queen, Thomas, and Zac Lawson. Frank, Thomas, and Lawson produced, while Frank and Queen acted as studio personnel. The song is composed in the key of D♭, with a tempo of 120 beats per minute and a time signature of 4/4.

The song demonstrates the styles of pop, rock, and Christian music. Timothy Yap of Jubilee Cast observed that "the track delivers a poignant message of hope and urgency, urging listeners to reflect on their faith in the face of a rapidly changing world".

== Commercial performance ==
"Jesus Is Coming Back Soon" debuted at No. 22 on the Recorded Music NZ Hot Singles chart. In the US, the song hit No. 6 on the Hot Christian Songs chart, supported by entries of No. 1 Christian Digital Song Sales and No. 12 on the Christian Streaming Songs. It peaked at No. 3 on the Digital Song Sales.

The song marks Queen's first entry into a secular international chart, as well as his first number-one hit.

== Personnel ==
Credits adapted from Tidal Music.

- Dylan Thomas – writer, producer
- Forrest Frank – writer, producer, studio personnel
- Josiah Queen – writer, studio personnel
- Zac Lawson – writer, producer

== Charts ==
Chart performance for "Jesus Is Coming Back Soon"
Chart (2025)	Peak position
New Zealand Hot Singles (RMNZ)	22
US Digital Song Sales (Billboard)	3
US Hot Christian Songs (Billboard)	6

== Release history ==
Release history for "Jesus Is Coming Back Soon"
Region	Date	Format	Label	Ref.
Various	October 3, 2025	Digital download; streaming	River House Records; 10K Projects	

== See also ==
- "Charlie", a political hip-hop song by rapper Tom MacDonald
- "We Are Charlie Kirk", a gospel song by AI-generated artist SPALEXMA
