= Tate Butts =

American musician (born 2011)

- Born: August 26, 2011 (age 15)
- Origin: Walhalla, South Carolina
- Genres: Christian; gospel
- Occupations: singer; songwriter
- Years active: 2025–present
- Labels: Warner Records; Enchntmnt LLC
- Publisher: Spirit Sound Music Group

Tate Butts (born August 26, 2011) is an American Christian musician from South Carolina. Butts is signed to Warner Records and Enchntmnt LLC, and released his debut single, "My Defender", in November 2025. Butts was fourteen-years-old at the release of his debut single, and his age has caused him to garner attention from younger audiences.

== Career ==
In late July 2025 at the age of thirteen years old, Butts competed in the International Teen Talent 2025, hosted by the Global Worship Initiative at Lee University, where he performed his song, "My Defender". At the competition, he was awarded with first place in the category of Solo Songwriting. The award for this category was a publishing agreement with Spirit Sound Music Group. In October of that year, Butts appeared on stage allongside Brandon Lake to perform a rendition of Lake's song "Hard Fought Hallelujah". The performance was filmed and released to social media, where it garnered press attention, mainly due to Butts' vocal ability, as well his age.

On November 21, 2025, Butts released "My Defender" as his debut single, via Warner Records and Enchntmnt LLC. The song garnered notable public attention; within its first week, the track received over a million streams, and by April 2026 had achieved 15 million. "My Defender" entered the Billboard Hot Christian Songs chart at number 35, and entered the Christian Digital Song Sales chart at number 13. The subsequent "Brought Me This Far" was released as Butts' second single on April 10, 2026. On July 10, 2026, he released his debut extended play, Something to Believe In.

== Music style ==
Butts' style has been described as Christian and gospel music. Jesus Freak Hideout made note of his ability to implement "catchy melodies" as well as a "grounded sense of authenticity".

== Discography ==
=== Extended plays ===
Title	Details
Something to Believe In	Released: July 10, 2026; Label: Independent; Formats: Digital download, streaming

=== Singles ===
Title	Year	Peak chart positions		Album
Title	Year	US Digital	US Christ.	Album
"My Defender"	2025	—	35	Something to Believe In (EP)
"Brought Me This Far"	2026	—	—	Something to Believe In (EP)
"Somebody Prayed" (with Forrest Frank)	2026	23	17	Non-album single
"—" denotes a recording that did not chart or was not released in that territory.

=== Promotional singles ===
Title	Year	Album
"When I Pray"	2026	Something to Believe In (EP)
