= Big Wild =

American electronic producer, composer, vocalist and sound engineer

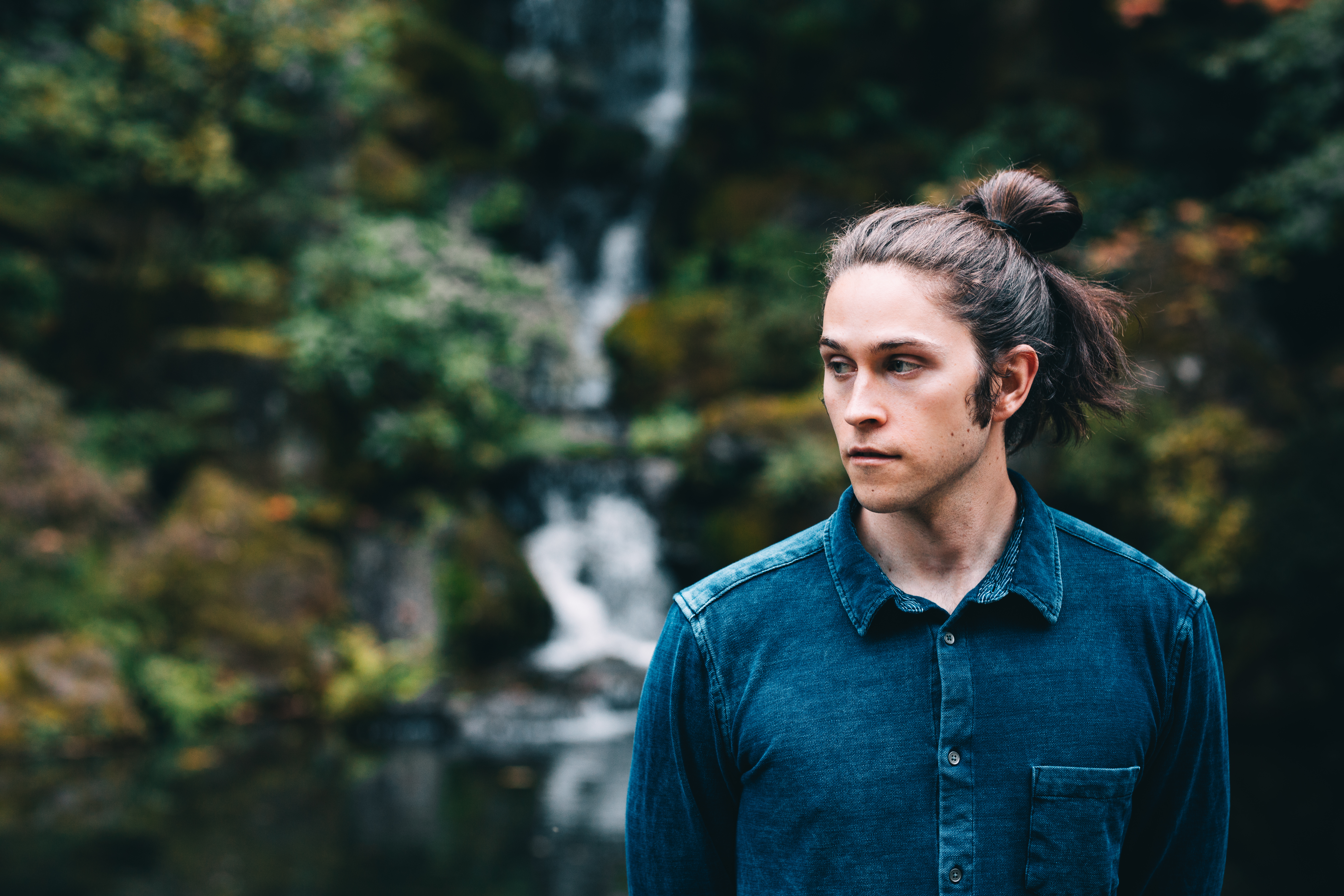

Background information
- Born: Jackson Stell; August 31, 1990 (age 36); Lancaster, Massachusetts, United States
- Origin: Worcester, Massachusetts, United States
- Genre: Electronic
- Occupations: Producer, songwriter, vocalist, instrumentalist
- Instruments: Vocals, drum pads, keyboards, synths
- Years active: 2012–present
- Labels: Foreign Family Collective, Counter Records, Giant Music
- Website: bigwildmusic.com

Jackson Stell (born August 31, 1990), known by his stage name Big Wild, is an American electronic music producer, songwriter, vocalist and sound engineer.

As a performer, his live shows often consist of switching between multiple instruments (drum pads, synths, keyboards and live vocals). Coinciding with the release of his debut album, Superdream, Big Wild kicked off a world tour in the Spring of 2019.

== Career ==
Stell began his music career as a hip-hop beat producer, known as J Beatz, in his native Massachusetts at the age of 14. Stell graduated from Northeastern University and worked as a composer for an advertising agency before moving to Los Angeles, where he switched his focus to producing electronic music and singing under the moniker Big Wild.

In 2015, Big Wild began touring with electronic duo Odesza; later that year, he collaborated with the duo on a remix of their track "Say My Name". Big Wild's first breakout track, "Aftergold" featuring Tove Styrke, was released in April 2015, topping the Spotify Global Viral chart upon release. He released his debut EP, Invincible, in February 2017.

In February 2019, after signing with Counter Records, Big Wild released his debut album, Superdream. The new album debuted Big Wild as the primary vocalist, lyricist, and songwriter for the first time. Rooted in electronica, the album also features elements of energetic pop, indie and disco.

In September 2022, Big Wild released his second album, The Efferusphere.

== Personal life ==
Stell lives with his wife in Portland, Oregon. Many members of Stell's family are also musicians; his father played guitar and participated in a few bands throughout college, his mother was a life long choir singer, and his grandmother was a big band vocalist in the 1930s and 1940s.

In late September 2013, Stell was diagnosed with thyroid cancer. He announced he was "healthy and cured" in an Instagram post, in which he also shared his struggles with depression. His experience battling and recovering from thyroid cancer inspired the song "Maker" on his album Superdream.

== Discography ==
=== Albums ===
Title	Details	Peak chart positions	
Title	Details	US Dance	US Heat
Superdream	Released: February 1, 2019; Label: Counter	16	23
The Efferusphere	Released: September 9, 2022; Label: Opposition		
Wild Child	Released: August 29, 2025; Label: Giant Music		

=== Extended plays ===
Title	Details
Empty Room (featuring Yena)	Released: April 21, 2017; Label: Foreign Family Collective
Invincible EP	Released: February 10, 2017; Label: Foreign Family Collective

=== Singles ===
Title	Details	Album	Certifications
"Ayahuasca at Night"	Released: December 15, 2013; Label: Self-released		
"La Brisa"	Released: January 2, 2014; Label: Self-released		
"Venice Venture"	Released: July 15, 2014; Label: Self-released		
"Shadows"	Released: September 15, 2014; Label: Self-released		
"Jubilee"	Released: January 1, 2015; Label: Self-released		
"Aftergold"	Released: March 25, 2016; Label: Foreign Family Collective		
"I Just Wanna"	Released: January 13, 2017; Label: Foreign Family Collective		
"When I Get There"	Released: February 9, 2017; Label: Foreign Family Collective		* RIAA: Gold
"Show Me" (featuring Hundred Waters)	Released: October 9, 2017; Label: Foreign Family Collective		
"Ascension"	Released: May 23, 2018; Label: Foreign Family Collective		
"Joypunks / Maker"	Released: October 31, 2018; Label: Counter	Superdream	
"Heaven"	Released: December 4, 2018; Label: Counter	Superdream	
"City of Sound"	Released: January 10, 2019; Label: Counter	Superdream	
"6's to 9's" (featuring Rationale)	Released: January 10, 2019; Label: Counter		* RIAA: Gold
"Awaken (Feel Alive)" (with Surfaces)	Released: October 15, 2021; Label: 10K Projects		
"Feel Good"	Released: June 1, 2022; Label: Opposition	The Efferusphere	
"Red Sun"	Released: July 7, 2022; Label: Opposition	The Efferusphere	
"OMGarden"	Released: July 27, 2022; Label: Opposition	The Efferusphere	
"Blue"	Released: August 24, 2022; Label: Opposition	The Efferusphere	

=== Remixes ===
Title	Artist
"Say My Name"	Odesza
"Talking to Myself"	Gallant
"Generationwhy"	Zhu
"Empty Threat"	Chvrches
"Show Me Love"	Hundred Waters
"For the Love"	GRiZ featuring Talib Kweli
"Hey Mami"	Sylvan Esso
"Hello"	Grouplove
