= The Present (song) =

Single by Forrest Frank
- Released: November 15, 2024
- Length: 3:03
- Label: River House Records
- Songwriters: Forrest Frank; Pera Krstajić
- Producers: Forrest Frank; Pera Krstajić

Forrest Frank singles chronology
"Your Way's Better" (2024)	"The Present" (2024)	"Drop!" (2025)

Music video
- "The Present" on YouTube

"The Present" is a non-album single by Forrest Frank, an American Christian hip-hop and lo-fi singer and musician. The song was released as a non-album single on November 15, 2024, through Frank's independent label River House Records. The single reached No. 13 on the Billboard Hot Christian Songs chart, No. 14 on the Christian Airplay chart, No. 20 on the Christian Adult Contemporary Airplay chart, and No. 5 on the Christian Digital Song Sales chart.

Lyrically, the song is Christmas-themed. It was written and produced by Forrest Frank and Pera Krstajić.

== Charts ==
Weekly chart performance for "The Present"
Chart (2024–2025)	Peak position
Australia Christmas Airplay (TCM)	2
US Christian Adult Contemporary (Billboard)	11
US Christian Airplay (Billboard)	10
US Hot Christian Songs (Billboard)	9
