= Heaven on My Mind (album) =

Studio album by tobyMac
- Released: March 7, 2025
- Recorded: 2023–2024
- Genres: CCM; pop; hip hop; soul
- Length: 38:29
- Labels: ForeFront; Capitol CMG
- Producers: Josiah Bell; Juan Winans; Jordan Mohilowski; Toby McKeehan; Kyle Williams; Tommee Profitt; Micah Kuiper; Bryan Fowler; Benji Cowart; Jeff Pardo

TobyMac chronology
Life After Death (2022)	Heaven on My Mind (2025)

Singles from Heaven on My Mind
- 1. "Nothin' Sweeter" Released: June 7, 2024; 2. "a lil Church (Nobody's Too Lost)" Released: December 6, 2024; 3. "God Did It" Released: January 10, 2025; 4. "Can't Stop Me" Released: February 7, 2025; 5. "Heaven on My Mind" Released: April 4, 2025; 6. "Oh My Soul (Psalm 103)" Released: May 30, 2025; 7. "Lord It Feels Good" Released: June 8, 2026; 8. "Campfire (That Very Love)" Released: June 12, 2026

Heaven on My Mind is the tenth studio album by Christian hip hop musician tobyMac. The album was announced on January 10, 2025, and was released on March 7, 2025 on Forefront Records and Capitol CMG. The album's first single, "Nothin' Sweeter", reached No. 6 on the Billboard Hot Christian Songs chart, and spent nine weeks at No. 1 on the Christian Airplay chart. On June 26, 2026, a deluxe edition of the album is scheduled for release, containing collaborative remixes of seven of the album's tracks.

== Background ==
Heaven on My Mind is inspired partially by the death of tobyMac's son, Truett McKeehan. The song "Goodbye (For Gabe)" is a tribute to his touring member and occasional studio collaborator, Gabe Patillo, who died of cancer in April 2024.

TobyMac announced through Instagram that he would be releasing one song a month until Heaven on My Mind is released.

== Critical reception ==
Professional ratings
Review scores
Source	Rating
Jesus Freak Hideout	4.5/5 stars
NewReleaseTuesday	5/5 stars

Speaking for Jesus Freak Hideout, Josh Balogh awarded the album a 4.5-out-of-5 star review, stating that Heaven on My Mind is one of tobyMac's top three best releases. In a second review from Jesus Freak Hideout, John DiBiase also gave the album 4.5-out-of-5 stars, calling the album "a solid album from start to finish" and one of the best of 2025. Reviewing for New Release Tuesday, Bill Pence gave the album a 5-out-of-5 star review, calling it a "strong effort from TobyMac".

=== Accolades ===
Year-end lists
Publication	Accolade	Rank	Ref.
Jesus Freak Hideout	Grace Graber's Album Picks of 2025	5	
Jesus Freak Hideout	John Dibiase's Album Picks of 2025	4	
Jesus Freak Hideout	Michael Carder's Album Picks of 2025	6	

== Commercial performance ==
Heaven on My Mind debuted at number 157 on the US Billboard 200 and atop the Top Christian Albums chart selling 10,000 album-equivalent units in its first week.

Four singles were released off the album. The first single was "Nothin' Sweeter", released on June 7, 2024, and reached number 6 on the Billboard Hot Christian Songs and number 1 on the Christian Airplay and Adult Contemporary. The second single released was "a lil Church (Nobody's Too Lost)" was released on December 6, 2024, and reached number 30 on the Hot Christian Songs chart. On January 10, 2025, "God Did It" was released. The song reached number 35 on the Hot Christian Songs chart. The fourth single released off the album was "Can't Stop Me", which was released on February 7, 2025. While not released as a single, the title track, "Heaven on My Mind", reached number 26 on the Billboard Hot Christian Songs.

== Track listing ==
No.	Title	Writer(s)	Producer(s)	Length
1.	"Heaven on My Mind"	Toby McKeehan; Jordan Mohilowski; Jess Cates	Toby McKeehan; Jordan Mohilowski	3:23
2.	"Lord It Feels Good"	McKeehan; Benji Cowart; Kyle Williams	McKeehan; Benji Cowart; Kyle Williams	2:51
3.	"Rearview" (with Juan Winans)	McKeehan; Josiah Bell; Juan Winans; Justin Gerard Gray	Josiah Bell; Juan Winans	2:56
4.	"God Did It"	McKeehan; Mohilowski; Cowart	McKeehan; Mohilowski	3:33
5.	"A Lil Church (Nobody's Too Lost)"	McKeehan; Cowart; Williams	McKeehan; Williams	3:04
6.	"Resist (Keep the Devil Away)" (with Terrian)	McKeehan; Bryan Fowler; Micah Kuiper; Terrian Woods	McKeehan; Micah Kuiper	3:23
7.	"Been Through It"	McKeehan; Jeff Pardo; Matthew West	McKeehan; Jeff Pardo	3:01
8.	"Can't Stop Me"	McKeehan; Mohilowski; Cowart	McKeehan; Mohilowski; Tommee Profitt	3:12
9.	"Nothin' Sweeter"	McKeehan; Mohilowski; Cowart	McKeehan; Mohilowski	2:56
10.	"Oh My Soul (Psalm 103)"	McKeehan; Fowler; Kuiper; Shawn Newby	Fowler; Kuiper	3:39
11.	"Campfire (That Very Love)"	McKeehan; Cowart; Williams	McKeehan; Williams	3:15
12.	"Goodbye (For Gabe)"	McKeehan; Mohilowski	McKeehan; Mohilowski	3:16
Total length:				38:29

Heaven on My Mind – Guest List Edition
No.	Title	Writer(s)	Producer(s)	Length
1.	"Heaven on My Mind" (featuring Forrest Frank)	Toby McKeehan; Jordan Mohilowski; Jess Cates	Toby McKeehan; Jordan Mohilowski	3:23
2.	"Lord It Feels Good" (featuring Gio.)	McKeehan; Benji Cowart; Kyle Williams	McKeehan; Benji Cowart; Kyle Williams	2:51
3.	"God Did It" (featuring Jamie MacDonald)	McKeehan; Mohilowski; Cowart	McKeehan; Mohilowski	3:33
4.	"Nothin' Sweeter" (featuring Jon Reddick)	McKeehan; Mohilowski; Cowart	McKeehan; Mohilowski	2:56
5.	"Oh My Soul (Psalm 103)" (featuring CeCe Winans)	McKeehan; Fowler; Kuiper; Shawn Newby	Fowler; Kuiper
6.	"Campfire (That Very Love)" (featuring Third Day)	McKeehan; Cowart; Williams	McKeehan; Williams	3:39
7.	"Heaven on My Mind" (featuring Petey Martin)	McKeehan; Mohilowski; Cates	McKeehan; Mohilowski	3:23

== Personnel ==
- TobyMac – songwriting, vocals, producer
- Bryan Fowler – producer, songwriting, programming, keyboards, bass, backing vocals
- Jeff Pardo – producer, songwriting, programming, keyboards, piano, synth pads, electric piano
- Jordan Mohilowski – producer, songwriting, backing vocals, guitar, keyboards, piano, programming, instrumentation, vocal editing
- Josiah Bell – producer, songwriting, engineering
- Juan Winans – producer, songwriting, engineering, backing vocals, guest vocals on "Rearview"
- Kyle Williams – producer, songwriting, backing vocals, vocal engineering, guitar, bass, instrumentation
- Micah Kuiper – producer, songwriting, engineering, vocal engineering, programming, guitar, bass, keyboards, backing vocals
- Tommee Profitt – producer, songwriting, programming, instrumentation
- Benji Cowart – producer, songwriting, backing vocals
- Justin Gray – songwriting, backing vocals
- Terrian – songwriting, backing vocals, guest vocals on "Resist (Keep the Devil Away)"
- Matthew West – songwriting, backing vocals
- Brent Milligan – bass
- David Curran – bass
- Justin Ostrander – guitar
- Tim Rosenau – guitar
- Scottie Mills – guitar
- Court Clement – guitar
- Matthew Ulrich – Hammond B-3 Organ, keyboards
- Sam Garner – piano
- Aaron Sterling – drums
- Jacob Arnold – drums
- Keith Everette Smith – horns, trumpet, horns arranger
- Steve Patrick – trumpet
- Barry Green – trombone
- Matt Jefferson – bass trombone
- Tyler Summers – saxophone
- Jimmy Bowland – baritone saxophone
- Mark Douthit – tenor saxophone
- Chris Bevins – vocoder
- Jon Reddick – backing vocals
- Andrew Thompson – backing vocals
- Calvin Nowell – backing vocals
- Janice Gaines – backing vocals
- Deondra Marowa – backing vocals
- Emoni Wilkins – backing vocals
- Madelyn Howze – backing vocals
- Maurice Staple – backing vocals
- Chuck Butler – vocal editing
- Doug Weier – mixing
- Nick Radovanovic – mixing
- Sean Moffitt – mixing
- Thomas Mann – mixing
- Atharva Dhenke – mastering
- Chris Gehringer – mastering
- Will Quinnell – mastering
- John DeNosky – additional engineering

== Charts ==
=== Weekly ===
Weekly chart performance for Heaven on My Mind
Chart (2025)	Peak position
US Billboard 200	157
US Top Christian Albums (Billboard)	1

=== Year-end ===
Year-end chart performance for Heaven on My Mind
Chart (2025)	Position
US Top Christian Albums (Billboard)	39
