= Neil Frank =

American meteorologist (1931–2025)

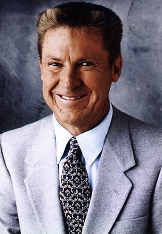
- Born: September 11, 1931; Kansas, U.S.
- Died: December 24, 2025 (aged 94)
- Education: Florida State University (PhD); Southwestern College (BS)
- Occupation: Meteorologist
- Title: Former director of the National Hurricane Center; former chief meteorologist at KHOU in Houston
- Spouse: Velma
- Children: 3
- Relatives: Forrest Frank (grandson)

Neil Laverne Frank (September 11, 1931 – December 24, 2025) was an American meteorologist and the director of the National Hurricane Center (NHC) in Coral Gables, Florida. He was instrumental in advancing both the scientific and informational aspects of hurricane forecasting. Frank retired in 2008 as chief meteorologist at KHOU in Houston.

== Early history and family ==
Neil Frank grew up in Wellington, Kansas, and attended nearby Southwestern College in Winfield. After receiving a bachelor's degree in chemistry in 1953 and then military training in weather forecasting, he earned master's and Ph.D. degrees in meteorology at Florida State University in Tallahassee. He also was a meteorologist in the U.S. Air Force at Homestead Air Force Base in Homestead, Florida. He was the grandfather of American singer Forrest Frank, best known as one half of the pop duo Surfaces and his solo career as a Contemporary Christian music performer.

== National Hurricane Center career ==
Frank served in the United States Air Force (USAF) where he received training as a weather officer before being a graduate meteorology student. In 1961, he began working as a forecaster for the NHC. He was appointed director of the center in 1974. While director, he also served as chairman of the International Hurricane Committee, which coordinates hurricane warnings across North America. He participated in meteorological experiments conducted off the coast of Africa. In 1987, Frank was called to testify as an expert witness before the United States Senate Committee on Commerce, Science, and Transportation. As of 2018 he was the longest serving director of the NHC.

As NHC director, Frank was in the news frequently and appeared in many interviews with CBS news anchor Dan Rather, whose early career included coverage of several hurricanes.

In 1980, Frank implemented an amateur radio station that became an important link for resilient communications and ground truth information, including the influential Hurricane Watch Net. The first major tropical cyclone they operated was catastrophic Hurricane Allen that same year. The NHC station communicated directly with the Brownsville Weather Center in Brownsville, Texas after it lost all of its conventional communications links. The only remaining link was the amateur radio station running on battery power. NHC and Brownsville discussed the strange behavior of the eye of Hurricane Allen while it stalled just off the Texas coast for nearly two hours. The station also provided crucial radio relays between hospitals, hospital ships, and relief organizations, sometimes again being the only communications method still operating in damaged areas.

== Broadcasting career ==
In June 1987, Frank retired from the National Hurricane Center and joined Houston's CBS affiliate, KHOU. He was well known to the Houston market from his reports as director of the National Hurricane Center, particularly from his work during Hurricane Alicia, which made landfall near Houston in 1983. Frank was the chief meteorologist for the television station for over 20 years receiving numerous awards. In December 2007, he announced that he would retire from broadcasting at KHOU-TV in 2008 and on May 19, 2008, Frank announced on the 10 pm broadcast that he was retiring at the end of May. He continued to provide the station with coverage of special weather projects and hurricanes.

== Global warming ==
Frank was a signatory to An Evangelical Declaration on Global Warming. It claims that Earth and its ecosystems, created by God's intelligent design and infinite power and sustained by his faithful providence, are robust, resilient, self-regulating, and self-correcting.

== Death ==
Frank died on December 24, 2025, at the age of 94.

== Professional memberships and awards ==
- Elected to council, American Meteorological Society, 1989–1992 term
- First place, 1989 Texas Press Awards, best weathercast
- 2004 recipient of the Belo William H. Seay Award

Preceded by Robert Simpson	Director of the National Hurricane Center; 1973–1987	Succeeded by Bob Sheets
