= Heaven on My Mind (TobyMac and Forrest Frank song) =

"Heaven On My Mind"

Single by tobyMac and Forrest Frank

from the album Heaven On My Mind
- Released: March 7, 2025
- Length: 3:01
- Label: FL Records; Capitol CMG; ForeFront
- Songwriters: Toby McKeehan; Jordan Mohilowski; Jess Cates; Forrest Frank
- Producers: Toby McKeehan; Jordan Mohilowski

tobyMac singles chronology
"Jesus Freak" (2025)	"Heaven On My Mind" (2025)	"Oh My Soul (Psalm 103)" (2025)

Forrest Frank singles chronology
"Nothing Else" (2025)	"Heaven On My Mind" (2025)	"No L's" (2025)

"Heaven On My Mind" is a song by American contemporary Christian musicians tobyMac and Forrest Frank. The song was initially released as the title track of tobyMac's tenth studio album of the same name, on March 7, 2025 before being officially released as a single on April 4, 2025. It was released on FL Records, Capitol Christian Music Group, and ForeFront Records.

== Background ==
"Heaven On My Mind" was initially released, not as a standalone track, but as the title track for tobyMac's tenth studio album, Heaven On My Mind. The album was released on March 7, 2025. The song itself charted at No. 26 on the Billboard Hot Christian Songs chart.

On April 4, 2025, "Heaven On My Mind" was first officially released as a single. The single version was sped-up, and featured Forrest Frank performing an additional verse.

Speaking about the song, tobyMac said, "for the last few years eternity has not been something I thought much about but lately it’s been on my mind a lot. I want to put treasure in Heaven which begins with loving well, being compassionate and treating people with dignity. We can make it as confusing as we want, but loving God and loving people is the road I want to walk."

== Accolades ==
Year	Organization	Category	Result	Ref.
2026	K-Love Fan Awards	Song of the Year	Nominated	

== Charts ==
=== Original version ===
Weekly chart performance for "Heaven On My Mind"
Chart (2025)	Peak position
US Hot Christian Songs (Billboard)	26

=== Forrest Frank version ===
==== Weekly chart ====
Weekly chart performance for "Heaven On My Mind"
Chart (2025)	Peak position
Australian Christian Airplay (TCM)	6
UK Christian Songs (Cross Rhythms)	1
US Christian AC Airplay (Billboard)	1
US Christian Airplay (Billboard)	1
US Hot Christian Songs (Billboard)	12

==== Year-end ====
Year-end chart performance for "Heaven on My Mind"
Chart (2025)	Position
Australian Christian Airplay (TCM)	26
UK Christian Songs (Cross Rhythms)	9
US Christian Songs (Billboard)	31
