= Surfaces (band) =

American pop music duo

- Origin: College Station, Texas, United States
- Years active: 2017–present
- Labels: Surfaces, LLC / 10K Projects, Caroline
- Spinoffs: Party Wave
- Members: Colin Padalecki
- Past members: Alexa Padalecki; Forrest Frank
- Website: www.surfacesmusic.com

Surfaces is an American music group based in College Station, Texas. Their music is a blend of surf music, jazz, soul, pop rock, hip hop, reggae, and calypso. They have released six studio albums. Their first independent studio album, Surf, was released in 2017. Their most recent album, All the Space Between, was released in 2026.

== History ==
Surfaces was formed in 2017. Colin Padalecki began creating music in high school with his cousin and singer Alexa Padalecki. Colin began to upload his music online while attending Texas A&M University in College Station, Texas. Forrest Frank, a recent Baylor University graduate from Texas, reached out to Colin after hearing his music and invited him to record music at his houseboat. They released their first album together under the moniker Surfaces in December 2017, entitled Surf. The album's third track, 24 / 7 / 365, has over 107 million streams on Spotify as of 2025. After the release of Surf, Forrest Frank released a project with producer Biskwiq (now Tsubi Club) under the alias "Forrest." in July 2018. The project, titled "Warm" was Forrest Frank's way of escapism to a sunny beaches from his depressing life living in a houseboat working at Abbott Laboratories in Seattle, Washington after graduating from Baylor University. Notable tracks from the project include "Your Soul" and "Why Not Me", which have amassed over 67 million and 40 million streams on Spotify respectively. The ukulele on the track titled "Grandpop Uke" belonged to his grandfather, after recording the song Forrest expressed that he broke down in tears feeling a heavy emotion for someone (his grandfather) whom he had never met. The same ukulele was later used on the song Alone by Surfaces.

In January 2019, the band released their second album, Where the Light Is, under the labels Caroline Records and Ten Thousand Projects. The seventh track from the album, "Sunday Best", became a top 40 hit in Canada, Ireland, New Zealand, Australia, Norway, the United Kingdom, and the United States, as well as the top 100 in Germany, Sweden, and Switzerland. The song has amassed over 1 billion streams on Spotify as of December 2024 and is believed to have gained its popularity from video-sharing app TikTok. It was released to radio in March 2020. A music video for the track was released on YouTube on July 10, 2019.

Their third album, Horizons, was released on February 28, 2020. The music duo released numerous singles as well, which included "Keep It Gold", "Good Day", "Bloom", and "Lazy", all of which were included as tracks in Horizons. In 2019, they also released two independent singles: "Palm Trees", and "Take Some Time", which were not featured on any album. Other singles include "Be Alright" and "Falling", which were both released in 2017. The single "Low" was released in 2018. Surfaces made their debut on late-night television on March 2, 2020, performing "Sunday Best" on Late Night with Seth Meyers. In June 2020, the band released "Learn to Fly", a single in collaboration with British singer Elton John, produced and recorded online, during the COVID-19 pandemic. By June 12, 2020, "Sunday Best" charted at No. 20 on the Billboard Hot 100; the single peaked at No. 19 a week later.

Their fourth album, Pacifico, was released on June 25, 2021. It features the single "Wave of You". The Deluxe version also includes the single "Sheesh!" with Tai Verdes. Their fifth album, Hidden Youth, was released on August 26, 2022. Their sixth album, Good Morning, released on June 21, 2024.

In 2023, Colin Padalecki's alma mater Texas A&M University asked the band to write a walkout song for their college football team. The song, titled "Aggie Intro", debuted during the fall 2023 football season and plays whenever the team takes the field during a game.

In 2024, Frank resumed his solo career as a Christian music performer after being signed to a major label, releasing his breakout album Child of God and embarking on the subsequent Child of God tour. In 2025, Surfaces released two singles, "Miss Sunshine" and "Livin' Alright", both of which Frank was absent from. In 2026, it was announced that Frank formed the Christian music super duo Party Wave with Noah Hayden. The duo's debut studio album, Dawn Patrol, was released on April 8, 2026.

== Discography ==
=== Studio albums ===
List of studio albums with selected chart positions
| Title | Details | Peak chart positions | | | | Certifications |
| Title | Details | US | CAN | FRA | NL | Certifications |
|---|---|---|---|---|---|---|
| Surf | Released: December 3, 2017; Label: Self-released; Formats: Digital download, streaming; Track listing: 1. "The Way"; 2. "Be Alright"; 3. "24 / 7 / 365"; 4. "Falling"; 5. "Alone"; 6. "Seattle Interlude"; 7. "Loving"; 8. "Stay"; 9. "Islands"; 10. "Ocean Breeze"; 11. "Kid Kingdoms" | — | — | — | — | |
| Where the Light Is | Released: January 6, 2019; Label: Caroline, TenThousand Projects; Formats: Digital download, streaming, vinyl; Track listing: 1. "Beautiful Day"; 2. "Shine On Top"; 3. "Heaven Falls / Falls On Me"; 4. "This View"; 5. "Grace"; 6. "Outside Interlude"; 7. "Sunday Best"; 8. "Where The Light Is"; 9. "Someday"; 10. "Home" | 104 | 57 | 108 | 30 | RIAA: Gold; RMNZ: Gold |
| Horizons | Released: February 28, 2020; Label: Caroline, TenThousand Projects; Formats: Digital download, streaming, vinyl, CD; Track listing: 1. "Rising"; 2. "Take It Easy"; 3. "Good Day"; 4. "Lazy"; 5. "Bloom"; 6. "Sunny Side Up"; 7. "Sky Interlude"; 8. "Remedy"; 9. "Dancing With Nobody"; 10. "All Around"; 11. "Horizons"; 12. "Keep It Gold" | — (Note: Horizons did not enter the Billboard 200, but peaked at No. 30 on the Billboard Independent Albums) | — | — | — | |
| Pacifico | Released: June 25, 2021; Label: Caroline, TenThousand Projects; Formats: Digital download, streaming, vinyl; Track listing: 1. "Climb"; 2. "Hideaway"; 3. "Let Me Know"; 4. "Yours"; 5. "On Time"; 6. "So Far Away"; 7. "Wave of You"; 8. "Feels The Same"; 9. "Next Thing (Loverboy)"; 10. "Come With Me"; 11. "Let It Ride"; 12. "Time Zones"; 13. "With You"; 14. "Malibu Interlude"; 15. "Come Åround"; 16. "Pacifico" | 141 | — | — | — | |
| Hidden Youth | Released: August 26, 2022; Label: Caroline, TenThousand Projects; Formats: Digital download, streaming, vinyl; Track listing: 1. "Into The Desert"; 2. "Golden Hour"; 3. "It Only Takes Two"; 4. "I Can't Help But Feel"; 5. "Falling Again"; 6. "Rooftops"; 7. "Rolling Stone"; 8. "What's Been On Your Mind?"; 9. "Champagne"; 10. "Brand New"; 11. "FInd A Way"; 12. "Hold Onto Me Baby" (ft. Felly); 13. "Open Water"; 14. "Cherry Blossom" | — | — | — | — | |
| Good Morning | Released: June 21, 2024; Label: TenThousand Projects; Formats: Digital download, streaming, vinyl; Track listing: 1. "Good Morning"; 2. "Sunrise"; 3. "Golden"; 4. "How Far Is Your Love" (ft. Los Loney Boys); 5. "A Long Time"; 6. "Real Estate"; 7. "Ocean Interlude"; 8. "History in the Making"; 9. "First Day Of My Life"; 10. "Don't Let Me Down" (ft. JVKE); 11. "Live It Up (High Tide)"; 12. "Cloud"; 13. "I Don't Cry Like I Used To"; 14. "Blue Jean Baby"; 15. "Goodnight" | — | — | — | — | |
| All the Space Between | Released: July 17, 2026; Label: Raw Sound; Formats: Digital download, streaming; Track listing: 1. "Blame It All on Me"; 2. "Let 'Em Go"; 3. "Your Way"; 4. "Call Me When You're Home"; 5. "All the Time"; 6. "Guess We'll Never Know"; 7. "Truman's Show"; 8. "Hold Me Tightly (Interlude); 9. "What Happened?"; 10. "Next Door"; 11. "Sundress"; 12. "The Porch Song"; 13. "Love to Grow / Layaway"; 14. "Just for Me"; 15. "Contact Lenses"; 16. "Snake Eyes" | — | — | — | — | |
"—" denotes a recording that did not chart or was not released in that territory.

=== Extended plays ===
List of EPs with selected chart positions
| Title | Details |
|---|---|
| Alive - EP | Released: October 16, 2016; Label: Surfaces Music; Track listing: 1. "Where We Belong)"; 2. "Play Pretend (ft. Felly and Healy)"; 3. "Sand (ft. PLC)"; 4. "Sunshine"; 5. "Far From the End" |
| Nostalgia | Released: December 11, 2020; Label: UMG Recordings, Inc., Surfaces; Formats: Digital download, streaming; Track listing: 1. "Learn To Fly - Extended Version (with Elton John)"; 2. "Be Alright"; 3. "Remedy"; 4. "Someday"; 5. "Where The Light Is"; 6. "Low" |
"—" denotes a recording that did not chart or was not released in that territory.

=== Singles ===
List of singles, showing year released, with selected chart positions and album name
| Title | Year | Peak chart positions | | | | | | | | | | Certifications | Album |
| Title | Year | US | AUS | CAN | DEN | FRA | NL | NZ | SWI | UK | WW | Certifications | Album |
|---|---|---|---|---|---|---|---|---|---|---|---|---|---|
| "Be Alright" | 2017 | — | — | — | — | — | — | — | — | — | — | | Surf |
| "Falling" | 2017 | — | — | — | — | — | — | — | — | — | — | | Surf |
| "Low" | 2018 | — | — | — | — | — | — | — | — | — | — | | Nostalgia |
| "Shine on Top" | 2018 | — | — | — | — | — | — | — | — | — | — | | Where the Light Is |
| "Heaven Falls / Fall on Me" | 2018 | — | — | — | — | — | — | — | — | — | — | | Where the Light Is |
| "Sunday Best" | 2019 | — | — | — | — | — | — | — | — | — | — | | Where the Light Is |
| "Palm Trees" | 2019 | — | — | — | — | — | — | — | — | — | — | | Non-album singles |
| "Take Some Time" | 2019 | — | — | — | — | — | — | — | — | — | — | | Non-album singles |
| "Keep It Gold" | 2019 | — | — | — | — | — | — | — | — | — | — | | Horizons |
| "Good Day" | 2019 | — | — | — | — | — | — | — | — | — | — | | Horizons |
| "Bloom" | 2019 | — | — | — | — | — | — | — | — | — | — | | Horizons |
| "Lazy" | 2020 | — | — | — | — | — | — | — | — | — | — | | Horizons |
| "Sunday Best" (re-release) | 2020 | 19 | 10 | 8 | 19 | 29 | 35 | 9 | 23 | 36 | 102 | RIAA: 3× Platinum; ARIA: 2× Platinum; BPI: Gold; IFPI DEN: Gold; IFPI SWI: Platinum; RMNZ: 3× Platinum; SNEP: Platinum | Where the Light Is |
| "Learn to Fly" (with Elton John) | 2020 | — | — | — | — | — | — | — (Note: "Learn to Fly" did not enter the NZ Top 40 Singles Chart, but peaked at number 14 on the NZ Hot Singles Chart.) | — | — | — | | The Lockdown Sessions |
| "Sail Away" | 2020 | — | — | — | — | — | — | — | — | — | — | | Non-album single |
| "Wave of You" | 2021 | — | — | — | — | — | — | — (Note: "Wave of You" did not enter the NZ Top 40 Singles Chart, but peaked at number 29 on the NZ Hot Singles Chart.) | — | — | — | RIAA: Gold | Pacifico |
| "Next Thing (Loverboy)" | 2021 | — | — | — | — | — | — | — | — | — | — | | Pacifico |
| "So Far Away" | 2021 | — | — | — | — | — | — | — | — | — | — | | Pacifico |
| "Sheesh!" (with Tai Verdes) | 2021 | — | — | — | — | — | — | — (Note: "Sheesh!" did not enter the NZ Top 40 Singles Chart, but peaked at number 30 on the NZ Hot Singles Chart.) | — | — | — | RIAA: Gold | Pacifico (Deluxe) |
| "C'est La Vie" (with Thomas Rhett) | 2021 | — | — | — | — | — | — | — | — | — | — | | Pacifico (Deluxe) |
| "Awaken (Feel Alive)" (with Big Wild) | 2021 | — | — | — | — | — | — | — | — | — | — | | Non-album single |
| "I Can't Help But Feel" | 2022 | — (Note: "I Can't Help But Feel" did not enter the Billboard Hot 100, but peaked at No. 30 on the Billboard Alternative Airplay) | — | — | — | — | — | — | — | — | — | | Hidden Youth |
| "What's Been On Your Mind?" | 2022 | — | — | — | — | — | — | — | — | — | — | | Hidden Youth |
| "Rooftops" | 2022 | — | — | — | — | — | — | — | — | — | — | | Hidden Youth |
| "Thankful" | 2023 | — | — | — | — | — | — | — | — | — | — | | Non-album single |
| "Real Estate" | 2023 | — | — | — | — | — | — | — | — | — | — | | Good Morning |
| "Cloud" | 2023 | — | — | — | — | — | — | — | — | — | — | | Good Morning |
| "Baby Blue" | 2023 | — | — | — | — | — | — | — | — | — | — | | Non-album single |
| "Don't Let Me Down" (with JVKE) | 2024 | — | — | — | — | — | — | — | — | — | — | | Good Morning |
| "Mexico" (with Goth Babe) | 2024 | — | — | — | — | — | — | — | — | — | — | | Non-album single |
| "Golden" | 2024 | — | — | — | — | — | — | — | — | — | — | | Good Morning |
| "Miss Sunshine" (with Arden Jones) | 2025 | — | — | — | — | — | — | — | — | — | — | | Non-album singles |
| "Livin Alright" (with Kota the Friend) | 2025 | — | — | — | — | — | — | — | — | — | — | | Non-album singles |
| "Call Me When You're Home" | 2026 | — | — | — | — | — | — | — | — | — | — | | All the Space Between |
| "Blame It All on Me" (with Mike Posner) | 2026 | — | — | — | — | — | — | — | — | — | — | | All the Space Between |
"—" denotes a recording that did not chart or was not released in that territory.

==== Promotional singles ====
List of promotional singles, showing year released and album name
| Title | Year | Album |
|---|---|---|
| "Surf" (Acoustic Sessions) | 2018 | Non-album single |
