= Tsubi Club =

Hyperpop music project based in California

- Also known as: Soren; Biskwiq
- Born: July 14, 1999 (age 27); Los Angeles, California
- Genres: Hyperpop; digicore
- Years active: 2017–2020 (as Biskwiq); 2021–present (as Tsubi Club)
- Website: tsubi.club

Tsubi Club is a hyperpop music project based in Los Angeles, California, headed by American record producer Soren. Soren originally produced sample-heavy lo-fi beats as Biskwiq, but rebranded to Tsubi Club in 2021, releasing the viral single "Burbank House." After a three year hiatus, he followed it up with "Laced Up" in 2024, and released his debut studio album, Trinket, in 2026.

== Career ==
In 2017, Soren began creating music as Biskwiq, primarily making lo-fi beats with frequent samples of late-2000s to mid-2010s pop rap songs such as "Over" by Drake, "Acid Rain" by Chance the Rapper, and "My Chain" by Gucci Mane. He also incorporated "Will Ferrell-era comedic soundbites" into his music. Soren collaborated with singer Forrest Frank for multiple songs in 2018.

Soren stopped releasing music under Biskwiq in 2020 and rebranded to the alias Tsubi Club, short for Tsunami Bitch Club. He released the project's debut single, "Burbank House", in October 2021. The song took influences from emo rap, alternative, and hyperpop and makes use of pitched-up vocals and electric guitars. It was accompanied by a multimedia music video drawing inspiration from anime. The song gained popularity after Soren supported Aries on his 2022 Australia tour. After a three-year hiatus, Soren released "Laced Up" in August 2024, which sampled "This Must Be My Exit" by Oso Oso. The music video continues a story established in "Burbank House" and depicts Soren washing up on a beach and fighting his way off of it. In November, he also released a cover of The Pillows' "The Third Eye" for the fan-made collaborative project FLCL Reanimated, which contained over 200 other artists.

On April 8, 2026, Soren released his debut studio album as Tsubi Club, Trinket. He had announced the album a week prior, on April Fools' Day. Soren discusses the hardships of being an artist in the album's lyrics, and the sound of the album has been compared to Porter Robinson, Roy Blair, and video game music. He began production on the album in November 2025, and completed it within five months. Citing his inspirations for Trinket, Soren named Ging Nang Boyz, 454, The Go! Team, the Katamari Damacy soundtrack, Cymbals, GRRL, Jenny01, Steve Reich, Marsh Crane, Username, Leroy, Sleigh Bells, Plus-Tech Squeeze Box, Dijon, Chocolat and Britney Spears.

== Discography ==
=== Studio albums ===
==== As Tsubi Club ====
Title	Details
Trinket	Released: April 8, 2026; Label: Self-released; Formats: Digital download, CD

==== As Biskwiq ====
Title	Details
Warm (with Forrest Frank)	Released: July 1, 2018; Label: Houseboat Records; Formats: Digital download

=== Extended plays ===
==== As Biskwiq ====
Title	Details
Buttermilk	Released: February 17, 2017; Label: Blvnt Records; Formats: Digital download

=== Singles ===
==== As Tsubi Club ====
Title	Year	Album
"Burbank House"	2021	Non-album singles
"Laced Up"	2024	Non-album singles
"The Third Eye"	2024	Non-album singles

==== As Biskwiq ====
Title	Year	Album
"Sk8board P"	2017	Non-album singles
"Cucumber Water"	2018	Non-album singles
"Sunday" (with Forrest Frank)	2018	Warm
"Lately" (with Forrest Frank and Ryce)	2018	Non-album singles
"High Strung" (with Atwood)	2020	Non-album singles
