= Lemonade (Forrest Frank and The Figs song) =

Single by Forrest Frank and The Figs

from the album Child of God II (Back to Back) Deluxe
- Released: August 1, 2025; October 3, 2025 (Folk remix)
- Genre: Pop; rock; Christian
- Length: 3:03
- Label: River House Records; 10K Projects
- Songwriter: Micah Yoder
- Producers: Forrest Frank; Bailey Gillen; Yoder

Forrest Frank singles chronology
"God's Got My Back" (2025)	"Lemonade" (2025)	"Selah" (2025)

The Figs singles chronology
"Colorado" (2024)	"Lemonade" (2025)	"Canary Bird" (2025)

Alternative cover
- Folk remixed cover

"Lemonade" is a song by Forrest Frank and The Figs. The song was released as a single on August 1, 2025, through River House Records and 10K Projects. It was written by Micah Yoder, and produced by Frank, Bailey Gillen, and Yoder. In the United States, the song peaked at number 77 on the Billboard Hot 100 and number 2 on the Hot Christian Songs chart, and internationally charted at number 17 on the New Zealand Hot Singles chart.

== Background ==
On July 19, 2025, Frank announced that, while in a skateboarding accident, and had suffered from multiple back fractures. After noticing a comment on social media asking how he would make music with the injury, he was inspired to record and produce a song themed around the back fracture, while on his hospital bed, resulting in the songs "Lemonade" and "God's Got My Back". Frank teased the songs online, and within three hours, it received several million views, later achieving over 42 million views. Seeing the song's success, he released "Lemonade" on August 1, 2025.

On October 3, 2025, a folk remixed version of the song was released. On November 14, 2025, Grace Graber released a punk rock cover of the song.

== Writing and production ==
"Lemonade" came into being when Gillen and Yoder released a YouTube video, in which they developed the song in an attempt to recreate Frank's style in a humorous way. After noticing the video, Frank saw the song's potential and requested to release it. Running for three minutes and three seconds, "Lemonade" is composed in the key of E major with a speed of 118 beats per minute and a time signature of 4/4. The song was written by Frank, and The Figs members Bailey Gillen and Micah Yoder. Frank, Gillen, and Yoder produced, while Jacob "Biz" Morris engineered. Frank spoke about the song's inspiration, stating,

Following God is kind of hilarious because I’m feeling thankful for my back breaking? Just a few years ago, I was depressed and at the end of myself... now I have 24/7 access to unspeakable joy in every circumstance! Drugs don’t do this, money can’t do this, nothing else…only Jesus.

The song demonstrates the genres of pop, rock, and contemporary Christian.

== Commercial performance ==
"Lemonade" led the iTunes and Apple Music all-genre and Christian song charts soon after being released. Within less than a week, the song received three million digital streams.

Within the song's first charting frame, it debuted at No. 17 on the Recorded Music New Zealand Hot Singles chart, No. 77 on the Billboard Hot 100, and No. 2 on the Hot Christian Songs. That week, it also hit No. 2 on Christian Streaming Songs, No. 2 on the Digital Song Sales, and No. 1 on the Christian Digital Song Sales. The song marked Frank's biggest career song debut, as well as the biggest Christian song debut of 2025.

In September 2025, the song entered the Christian Airplay chart at No. 38. It peaked at No. 36 in November.

== Industry awards ==
Year	Organization	Category	Result	Ref.
2026	ASCAP Awards	Most Performed Christian Songs	Honored	

== Personnel ==
Credits adapted from Tidal Music.

- Bailey Gillen – producer
- Forrest Frank – producer
- Jacob "Biz" Morris – engineer
- Micah Yoder – writer, producer

== Charts ==
=== Weekly ===
Weekly chart performance for "Lemonade"
Chart (2025–2026)	Peak position
Australian Christian Airplay (TCM)	3
New Zealand Hot Singles (RMNZ)	17
New Zealand Airplay (Radioscope)	22
UK Christian Songs (Cross Rhythms)	2
US Billboard Hot 100	77
US Christian Airplay (Billboard)	36
US Christian Hip Hop Airplay (GMA)	9
US Hot Christian Songs (Billboard)	2

=== Year-end ===
Year-end chart performance for "Lemonade"
Chart (2025)	Position
Australian Christian Airplay (TCM)	21
US Hot Christian Songs (Billboard)	17

== Release history ==
Release history for "Lemonade"
Region	Date	Format	Label	Ref.
Various	August 1, 2025	Digital download; streaming	River House Records; 10K Projects	
Various	September 5, 2025	CD; LP; digital download; streaming; (with Child of God II (Back to Back) Deluxe)	River House Records; 10K Projects	
Various	October 3, 2025	Digital download; streaming	Fig Tree Studios	
