= Child of God II =

Studio album by Forrest Frank
- Released: May 9, 2025
- Length: 58:53
- Label: River House Records; 10K Projects; Warner Music Group
- Producer: Forrest Frank; Pera Krstajić

Forrest Frank chronology
Home (2025)	Child of God II (2025)	Jesus Lofi Volume One (2025)

Singles from Child of God II
- 1. "Your Way's Better" Released: October 25, 2024; 2. "Drop!" Released: January 24, 2025; 3. "Nothing Else" Released: January 28, 2025; 4. "No L's" Released: April 11, 2025; 5. "Celebration" Released: April 18, 2025; 6. "Amen" Released: April 25, 2025; 7. "Woke Up This Morning" Released: May 2, 2025; 8. "Home" Released: May 5, 2025

Child of God II is the eighth studio album by American hip-hop and lo-fi musician Forrest Frank. The album was released on May 9, 2025, through River House Records and 10K Projects. It was made available for CD, LP, and digital download formats. Child of God II features guest appearances from Thomas Rhett, Nathan Davis Jr, and Limoblaze.

On September 5, 2025, Frank released Child of God II (Back to Back) Deluxe, featuring six additional tracks, and guest appearances from The Figs, Crowder, and Cory Asbury.

== Release and promotion ==
=== Singles ===
Child of God II features six previously released singles, "Your Way's Better", "Drop!", "Nothing Else", "Celebration", "No L's", and "Amen".

The first track released was "Your Way's Better". It was featured on the album Child of God: Deluxe Edition, which was released on November 1, 2024. The song was released on October 25, 2024, initially peaking at No. 19 on the Billboard Hot Christian Songs. In early 2025, the song reached a sudden breakout in popularity, proceeding to No. 2 on the Hot Christian Songs and No. 72 on the Hot 100. The song's popularity achievement is largely credited to promotion on social media, and a dance derived from the song.

The second single off the album was "Drop!", released on January 24, 2025. Lyrically, "Drop!" speaks about topics of humility.

The third track to be released was "Nothing Else", on February 28, 2025. The song featured country music-star Thomas Rhett. "Nothing Else" became a breakout single upon release, charting at No. 14 on the Billboard Digital Song Sales and No. 4 on the Hot Christian Songs, within the first week of release. On April 13, 2025, Rhett famously broke his ankle while performing the song alongside Frank in concert.

The fourth track to be released was "No L's", released on April 11, 2025. "No L's" used a sample of over 10,000 people, recorded at one of Frank's live performances on the Child of God Tour. It achieved a peak of No. 12 on the Billboard Hot Christian Songs.

The fifth single released was "Celebration", released on April 18, 2025. "Celebration" is Easter-themed in lyrics.

The sixth single of the album, was "Amen", released on April 25, 2025. "Amen" was released alongside an extended play of the same name, which featured the previous singles "Your Way's Better", "Nothing Else", "No L's", and "Celebration". The seventh single of the album, "Woke Up This Morning", a remix of the song by Nathan Davis Jr, was released the following week. The eighth and final single, "Home", was released on May 5, 2025.

=== Release ===
Child of God II was first announced on April 25, 2025, at a live performance in Los Angeles, California. On April 26, 2025, the album was officially announced to the public and made available for preorder. It exceeded 100,000 preorders within the first five days of its announcement.

On May 9, 2025, Child of God II was officially released. The album debuted at its peak position of No. 3 on the iTunes albums chart in the United States, and No. 15 in Canada.

== Writing and production ==
"Your Way's Better" was both written and produced by Forrest Frank and Pera Krstajić, while Frank wrote and produced "Drop!", "Nothing Else", and "Celebration". "No L's" was written by Frank, Krstajić, and Noah Hayden, with Frank and Krstajić handling production. "Amen" was written by Frank, Krstajić, and Zac Lawson, while Frank and Krstajić produced.

== Accolades ==
At the 2026 Grammy Awards, Child of God II was nominated for the award for Best Contemporary Christian Music Album.

Year	Organization	Category	Result	Ref.
2026	Grammy Awards	Best Contemporary Christian Music Album	Nominated	

Year-end lists
Publication	Accolade	Rank	Ref.
Jesus Freak Hideout	Eric McClanahan's Album Picks of 2025	2	
Jesus Freak Hideout	Michael Carder's Album Picks of 2025	5	

== Commercial performance ==
=== Album and extended plays ===
The Amen EP, released concurrently with the single "Amen", peaked at No. 3 on the Billboard Top Christian Albums. The Woke Up This Morning EP reached the same position on that chart.

The album itself debuted at its peak position of No. 83 on the OCC UK Album Downloads Chart and No. 3 on the OCC UK Christian & Gospel Chart. The album reached No. 12 on the Billboard 200 and No. 1 on the Top Christian Albums. It also charted on several minor Billboard charts, including No. 24 on the Top Streaming Albums, No. 8 on the Top Vinyl Records, No. 5 on the Top Album Sales, and No. 5 on the Top Current Albums.

=== Songs ===
"Your Way's Better", peaked at No. 62 on the Billboard Hot 100 chart. The song reached No. 1 on the Hot Christian Songs, No. 19 on the Christian Airplay, No. 20 on the Christian AC Airplay, and No. 2 on the Christian Digital Song Sales. The song also reached No. 41 on the Billboard TikTok Top 50.

The second single, "Drop!", peaked at No. 18 on the Billboard Hot Christian Songs. The third single of the album, "Nothing Else" became a breakout single upon release, charting at No. 14 on the Billboard Digital Song Sales, No. 4 on the Hot Christian Songs, and No. 2 on the Christian Digital Song Sales chart, within its first week of release.

The fifth track of the single, "No L's" peaked at No. 12 on the Hot Christian Songs chart, and the same position on the Christian Digital Song Sales. The song "Celebration" reached No. 14 on the Billboard Hot Christian Songs, and No. 9 on the Christian Digital Song Sales. The song "Amen" peaked at No. 14 on the Billboard Hot Christian Songs chart. The following single, "Woke Up This Morning", a remix of the same song by Nathan Davis Jr, reached No. 31 on the Billboard Hot Christian Songs. "Woke Up This Morning" also peaked at No. 5 on the Top Gospel Songs, No. 9 on the Gospel Streaming Songs, and No. 5 on the Gospel Digital Song Sales.

Upon release, eleven additional songs proceeded to enter the charts, including "Encore" at No. 44, "B.I.G." at No. 22, "Father's House" at No. 29, "Paradise" at No. 32, "Dancing in the Presence" at No. 37, "Outside" at No. 36, "Live Your Life" at No. 40, "Happy" at No. 31, "POV" at No. 46, and "In the Room" at No. 43.

== Critical reception ==
Professional ratings
Review scores
Source	Rating
CCM Magazine	5/5 stars
Today's Christian Entertainment	4.7/5 stars
Jesus Freak Hideout	4/5 stars 4.5/5 stars
Album of the Year	50/100
AllMusic	2.5/5 stars

Child of God II received generally favorable reviews from critics, most praising the album's diverse sound and ability to blend various genres.

Reviewing for CCM Magazine, Logan Sekulow compared the album to its predecessor, Child of God, saying that the sequel contains "softer production, more gospel-pop, and emotional depth", but still features the same "viral, high-energy joy" as the previous, giving the album a perfect 5-out-of-5 star review. From Today's Christian Entertainment, Mike Laxton awarded the album with a 4.7-out-of-5 star rating, calling it "joyful, intentional, and impossible not to move to".

Signaling in a 4-out-of-5 star review, Michael Carder from Jesus Freak Hideout labelled the album as "the pinnacle of Christian music", reviewing that the album incorporates "new sounds and collaborations" that "come together really well". In a second review for Jesus Freak Hideout, Josh Balogh credited the album with a 4.5-out-of-5 star rating, praising Frank's ability to blend trap, R&B, calypso, and reggae music.

Album of the Year gave the album 50/100, and AllMusic reviewed it with a 2.5-out-of-5 star rating.

== Track listing ==
No.	Title	Writer(s)	Producer(s)	Length
1.	"Encore" (interlude)	Forrest Frank	Forrest Frank	2:25
2.	"Your Way's Better"	Forrest Frank; Pera Krstajić	Forrest Frank; Pera Krstajić	3:18
3.	"Amen"	Forrest Frank; Zach Lawson; Pera Krstajić	Forrest Frank	2:13
4.	"B.I.G."	Forrest Frank; Pera Krstajić	Forrest Frank; Pera Krstajić	2:43
5.	"Father's House"	Forrest Frank; Noah Conrad; Pera Krstajić; Zach Lawson	Noah Conrad; Pera Krstajić	2:25
6.	"No L's"	Forrest Frank; Noah Hayden; Pera Krstajić	Forrest Frank; Pera Krstajić	2:27
7.	"Paradise"	Forrest Frank; Noah Hayden; Pera Krstajić	Forrest Frank; Pera Krstajić	2:19
8.	"Woke Up This Morning" (with Nathan Davis Jr)	Komba Raymond Aiah Jr; Nathan Davis Jr; Sofea Watkins	Forrest Frank; Pera Krstajić	2:11
9.	"Dancing in the Presence"	Forrest Frank	Forrest Frank	3:06
10.	"Nothing Else" (with Thomas Rhett)	Forrest Frank	Forrest Frank	1:58
11.	"Outside"	Forrest Frank; Noah Hayden; Pera Krstajić	Forrest Frank; Pera Krstajić	2:12
12.	"Live Your Life"	Forrest Frank; Noah Hayden; Pera Krstajić	Forrest Frank; Pera Krstajić	2:41
13.	"Celebration"	Forrest Frank	Forrest Frank	2:42
14.	"Happy"	Forrest Frank; Pera Krstajić	Forrest Frank; Pera Krstajić	2:17
15.	"Drop!"	Forrest Frank	Forrest Frank	3:54
16.	"Like Water" (with Limoblaze)	Forrest Frank; Limoblaze; Pera Krstajić	Forrest Frank; Pera Krstajić	2:42
17.	"POV"	Forrest Frank; Pera Krstajić	Forrest Frank; Pera Krstajić	2:38
18.	"In the Room"	Forrest Frank; Josiah Queen; Pera Krstajić	Forrest Frank; Pera Krstajić	3:32
19.	"Testimony" (monologue)	Forrest Frank; Pera Krstajić	Forrest Frank	8:01
20.	"Home"	Forrest Frank; Pera Krstajić	Forrest Frank; Pera Krstajić	3:07
Total length:				59:14

Deluxe edition
No.	Title	Writer(s)	Producer(s)	Length
21.	"God's Got My Back"	Forrest Frank	Forrest Frank	2:38
22.	"Lemonade" (with The Figs)	Forrest Frank; Micah Yoder; Bailey Gillen	Forrest Frank; Micah Yoder; Bailey Gillen	3:03
23.	"The Rock" (with Crowder)	Forrest Frank; David Crowder	Forrest Frank	2:48
24.	"Selah"	Forrest Frank; Josh Holiday	Forrest Frank	3:23
25.	"Through the Night"	Forrest Frank; Pera Krstajić	Forrest Frank; Pera Krstajić	2:45
26.	"Misunderstood" (with Cory Asbury)	Forrest Frank; Cory Asbury; Zac Lawson	Forrest Frank; Noah Conrad	3:50
Total length:				1:17:42

== Personnel ==
Adapted from Tidal.

- Amanda Bradshaw – choir
- Forrest Frank – producer, programmer, lead vocals, writer
- Grace Pehrman – choir
- Ilija Mihailovic – choir
- Jacob Morris – masterer, mixing
- Limoblaze – guest vocals
- Mike Cervantes – mastering
- Nathan Davis Jr – guest vocals
- Neil Frank – writer
- Noah Hayden – writer
- Pera Krstajić – producer, programmer, writer
- Ray Boukris – engineer
- Thomas Rhett – guest vocals
- Tyler Christian – choir
- Zach Lawson – writer

== Charts ==
=== Weekly ===
Weekly chart performance for Child of God II
Chart (2025)	Peak position
UK Album Downloads (OCC)	83
UK Christian & Gospel Albums (OCC)	3
US Billboard 200	12
US Top Christian Albums (Billboard)	1

=== Year-end ===
Year-end chart performance for Child of God II
Chart (2025)	Position
US Billboard 200	168
US Top Christian Albums (Billboard)	2
