= Child of God (album) =

Studio album by Forrest Frank
- Released: July 26, 2024
- Length: 58:44
- Label: River House Records; 10K Projects; Warner Music Group
- Producer: Forrest Frank

Forrest Frank chronology
Never Get Used to This (2023)	Child of God (2024)	Amen (2025)

Singles from Child of God
- 1. "No Longer Bound" Released: January 6, 2023; 2. "Lift My Hands" Released: March 10, 2023; 3. "Hallelujah" Released: January 1, 2024; 4. "Good Day" Released: January 19, 2024; 5. "Up!" Released: March 1, 2024; 6. "Always" Released: March 15, 2024; 7. "God Is Good" Released: April 12, 2024; 8. "Never Get Used to This" Released: July 9, 2024

Singles from Child of God (deluxe)
- 1. "Your Way's Better" Released: October 25, 2024

Professional ratings
Review scores
Source	Rating
NewReleaseToday	5/5 stars
The Jericho Sound	91/100

Child of God is the seventh studio album and major label debut by Forrest Frank. It was released on River House Records, 10K Projects, and Warner Music Group on July 26, 2024. The album debuted at No. 1 on the Billboard Top Christian Albums chart and remained there for seventeen consecutive weeks, making it the biggest Christian album debut of 2024.

The album was made available as a digital download and for streaming, as well as physically on CD, cassette, and LP. It sold 22,000 copies in the US within its first week. The track "What Living is All About" is a recording of the testimony by Forrest Frank's grandfather, Neil Frank. The album includes the song "Good Day", which reached No. 1 on the Billboard Christian Digital Song Sales chart and won the 2024 GMA Dove Awards for Pop/Contemporary Recorded Song of the Year. The song "No Longer Bound", with Hulvey, reached No. 2 on the US Viral Top 50 chart on Spotify.

On October 25, 2024, Frank announced plans for a deluxe edition. It was released on November 1, 2024. On July 22, 2025, the album was certified gold by the Recording Industry Association of America.

== Commercial performance ==
The album debuted at No. 28 on the Billboard 200. In addition, it appeared at No. 1 on the Billboard Top Christian Albums chart and No. 4 on the Official Charts Top Christian/Gospel Albums chart, peaked at No. 3 in May 2025. The album reached No. 8 on the Top Album Sales and Top Current Album Sales. It reached No. 1 on the worldwide iTunes chart. It is credited as being the biggest Christian album debut of the year. The album remained at No. 1 for seventeen consecutive weeks and thirty cumulative weeks.

The first single released off the album was "No Longer Bound". The song peaked at No. 19 on the Billboard Hot Christian Songs chart. It was followed by "Hallelujah", which reached No. 39 on the same chart. The third single to be released off Child of God was "Good Day", which peaked at No. 22 on the Billboard Bubbling Under Hot 100 chart, No. 2 on the Hot Christian Songs, No. 1 on the Christian Digital Song Sales chart, and No. 8 on the Country Airplay chart.

The fourth single to be released off the album was "UP!", which reached No. 8 on the Hot Christian Songs chart. It was followed by "Always", which reached No. 19 on the Hot Christian Songs chart. The seventh single off the album, "God Is Good", peaked at No. 18 on the Hot Christian Songs, and No. 3 on the Christian Airplay. The final single off the album was "Never Get Used To This", which peaked at No. 6 on the Hot Christian Songs, and No. 39 on the Recorded Music New Zealand Hot Singles. The single "Your Way's Better", from the deluxe edition, charted at No. 19 on the Hot Christian Songs.

Although not released as a single, the songs "Miracle Worker", "Safe and Sound", "Never Left My Side", "More Than A Feeling", "All I Need", and "Life Is Good" entered the Billboard charts. On the deluxe edition, the songs "Heaven On This Earth", "Ups & Downs", and "Crazy" also entered the charts.

== Awards and certifications ==
At the 2025 Grammy Awards, Child of God was a nominee for Best Contemporary Christian Album. It was nominated for Best Christian Album at the 2024 Billboard Music Awards. At the 2024 NewReleaseToday We Love Awards, the album was nominated Pop Album of the Year and Album of the Year, the results of which are pending.

At the 2023 GMA Dove Awards, the song "No Longer Bound" was nominated as Rap/Hip-Hop Recorded Song of the Year. That same year, the song was nominated for the Mainstream Impact Award at the We Love Awards. At the 2024 GMA Dove Awards, "Good Day" won Pop/Contemporary Recorded Song of the Year. "Good Day" was also nominated as Top Christian Song at the Billboard Music Awards that year. At the 2024 We Love Awards, it was nominated for Pop Song of the Year. At the same awards, "UP!" was nominated as Song of the Year, and "God Is Good" was nominated as Rap/Urban Song of the Year. The results of the We Love Awards are currently pending.

Awards
Year	Organization	Award	Result	Ref.
2024	Billboard Music Awards	Top Christian Album	Nominated	
2024	We Love Awards	Pop Album of the Year	Nominated	
2024	We Love Awards	Album of the Year	Nominated	
2025	Grammy Awards	Best Contemporary Christian Music Album	Nominated	
2025	GMA Dove Awards	Pop/Contemporary Album of the Year	Won	

Year-end lists
Publication	Accolade	Rank	Ref.
Louder Than The Music	LTTM Album Awards 2024	2	
Jesus Freak Hideout	Josh Balogh's Album Picks	10	
Jesus Freak Hideout	David Craft's Album Picks	8	
Jesus Freak Hideout	Michael Carder's Album Picks	2	

== Track listing ==
No.	Title	Writer(s)	Length
1.	"What Living Is All About" (monologue)	Neil Frank	2:39
2.	"No Longer Bound" (with Hulvey)	Forrest Frank; Christopher Hulvey	3:00
3.	"UP!" (with Connor Price)	Forrest Frank; Connor Price	2:16
4.	"More Than a Feeling"	Forrest Frank; Pera	3:24
5.	"Safe and Sound" (with CAIN)	Forrest Frank; Logan Cain; Madison Cain Johnson; Taylor Cain Matz	2:58
6.	"Life Is Good"	Forrest Frank; Jake Lawson; Fady Hanna; Zac Lawson	2:48
7.	"Miracle Worker" (with Tori Kelly)	Forrest Frank; Pera; Tori Kelly	3:03
8.	"Hey Grandad" (monologue)	Neil Frank	3:20
9.	"All I Need" (with Hulvey)	Forrest Frank; Hulvey	3:23
10.	"God Is Good" (with Caleb Gordon)	Forrest Frank; Caleb Gordon	3:27
11.	"Always"	Forrest Frank	2:38
12.	"Rich Man"	Forrest Frank	3:16
13.	"Hallelujah"	Forrest Frank	2:29
14.	"Well Done" (with Sam Rivera)	Forrest Frank; Sam Rivera	2:17
15.	"Good Day"	Forrest Frank	2:51
16.	"Sunshine"	Forrest Frank; Noah Conrad; Pera	2:58
17.	"Never Get Used to This" (with JVKE)	Forrest Frank; JVKE; Jackson Foote; Johnny Simpson; Zack Lawson; Nicky Yore	2:25
18.	"Never Left My Side"	Forrest Frank; Splash of Soda	2:33
19.	"Lift My Hands"	Forrest Frank	3:39
20.	"Child of God" (with Jonothan Pokluda)	Forrest Frank; Jonathan Pokluda; Pera	3:13
Total length:			58:44

Deluxe edition
No.	Title	Writer(s)	Length
1.	"Your Way's Better"	Forrest Frank	3:18
2.	"Ups & Downs"	Forrest Frank	2:41
3.	"Heaven on This Earth" (with Torey D'Shaun)	Forrest Frank	3:05
4.	"Crazy" (with Nic D)	Forrest Frank	2:32
5.	"Alive"	Forrest Frank	3:01
6.	"God Takes Breaks"	Forrest Frank	2:26
7.	"Beautiful as You"	Forrest Frank	2:59
Total length:			78:46

=== Notes ===
Expanded edition tracks are followed by original edition tracks from Track 8–27.

== Charts ==
=== Weekly charts ===
Chart (2024–2025)	Peak position
UK Christian & Gospel Albums (OCC)	3
US Billboard 200 (Billboard)	28
US Top Christian Albums (Billboard)	1

=== Year-end charts ===
Chart (2024)	Position
US Top Christian Albums (Billboard)	12
Chart (2025)	Position
US Billboard 200	120
US Top Christian Albums (Billboard)	1

== Certifications ==
Region	Certification	Certified units/sales
United States (RIAA)	Gold	500,000^{‡}
^{‡} Sales+streaming figures based on certification alone.
