= Forrest Frank =

American singer, songwriter and producer (born 1995)

- Born: Forrest Neil Frank; April 8, 1995 (age 31); Fulshear, Texas, U.S.
- Occupations: Singer; songwriter; record producer; rapper
- Years active: 2017–present
- Works: Discography (production)
- Spouse: Grace Quinn (m. 2020)
- Children: 2
- Relatives: Neil Frank (grandfather)
- Musical career
- Genres: Contemporary Christian; Christian hip-hop
- Labels: River House; Warner Music Group; 10K Projects
- Member of: Party Wave
- Formerly of: Surfaces
- Website: forrestfrank.com

Forrest Neil Frank (born April 8, 1995) is an American singer, songwriter, record producer and rapper from Fulshear, Texas. He rose to fame as one half of the pop music duo Surfaces and went on to have further success as a solo performer of Christian music, as well as a member of the Christian music superduo Party Wave. He is signed to River House Records, Warner Music Group, and 10K Projects. His 2024 studio album Child of God sold 22,000 copies within the first week, and held the top position on the Billboard Top Christian Albums chart for 35 non-consecutive weeks. He is the grandson of American meteorologist Neil Frank.

In 2025, Frank's song "Your Way's Better" reached the top of the Hot Christian Songs chart and entered the Billboard Hot 100. It peaked at No. 61. The concurrent album, Child of God II, was No. 1 on the Top Christian Albums chart and also No. 12 on the Billboard 200.

== Career ==
=== Warm and Effortless (2018–2020) ===
Frank released his debut studio album, Warm, on July 1, 2018, through Houseboat records. It was a collaboration with producer Biskwiq, now known as Tsubi Club. It was followed by Effortless, released on July 24, 2020, on River House Records. Both releases were under the mononymous stage name Forrest.

=== Nostalgia Pack, California Cowboy, New Hymns, and A Merry Lofi Christmas (2021–2023) ===
Forrest Frank was named Billboard's No. 1 new Christian artist of 2023. He released his third album, Nostalgia Pack, on May 26, 2023, which is a collection of old songs, ideas, and demos from "a different time". It was followed by California Cowboy, released a month later on June 16, 2023. He had worked on the album since 2021. He said of the album, "[From] start to finish, [California Cowboy] tells a complete tale." New Hymns was released on October 30, 2023, and included twelve songs which blend together pop music with traditional hymns. A Merry Lofi Christmas, a holiday themed album, was released on November 10, 2023. It includes classic Christmas songs reimagined as lo-fi and hip-hop.

His song "No Longer Bound" was No. 44 on Billboard's Hot Christian Songs year-end chart of 2023. Billboard considered him to be the 50th best charting Christian Artist of 2023.

=== Child of God (2024) ===
On April 12, 2024, Forrest Frank released the God Is Good EP, in association with Caleb Gordon. It was succeeded on April 26, 2024, by the All the Time EP, released with nobigdyl. On June 11, 2024, he announced his first solo tour, called the Child of God Tour. The tour visited 17 US cities, with openers Josiah Queen, Antoine Bradford, and nobigdyl. On July 26, 2024, he released his album Child of God. The album debuted at No. 1 on the Billboard Top Christian Albums and remained there for several months, making it the highest Christian album debut of the year. On October 25, 2024, he announced plans for a deluxe version of Child of God including seven bonus tracks. The album came out on November 1. On November 15, he released a Christmas-themed single, "The Present". His first headlining Child of God Tour in 2024, attracted 48,246 persons across 17 reported shows.

On December 2, 2024, Frank announced that the Child of God Part II tour for 2025. On the tour, he was supported by Elevation Rhythm. The tour attracted 214,626 attendees across 26 performances and generated more than $11 million in revenue.

=== Child of God II and The Jesus Generation (2025–present) ===
At the 2025 NewReleaseToday We Love Awards, Frank led with the most nominations, seven. He won the award for Rap/Urban Song of the Year with "God Is Good".

On January 24, 2025, he released his first single of the year, titled "Drop!". It was followed on February 7 by "Sunrise", and on February 28 by "Nothing Else". On April 4, 2025, he was featured on a rendition of tobyMac's "Heaven On My Mind". On April 11, he released the song "No L's", "Celebration" was next on April 18, and "Amen" on April 25. On April 25, 2025, the album Child of God II was announced and it was released on May 9, 2025. On July 19, 2025, Frank announced that in a skateboarding accident, and had suffered from multiple back fractures. Drawing inspiration from this, he released "God's Got My Back" on July 25, 2025, and "Lemonade", with the Figs, on August 1.

In September 2025, shortly following the assassination of political activist Charlie Kirk, Frank released a video to social media in which he addressed the topic. He stated that, in reference to Jesus' second coming:

He's coming back real soon. So if you have not gotten your heart right with Him and dropped down on your knees and repented to him. Today is the day. The hour is at hand. I don't know if you can feel it too. There's a heaviness, something shifted, and I don't care. I don't care anymore. I just want you to know that Jesus Christ is here and He loves you.

The statement received mixed public reception: the video garnered over one million likes; alternatively, it caused Frank to lose 30,000 followers on the platform. On October 3, 2025, he released a song themed around the statement he made, titled "Jesus Is Coming Back Soon", which featured Josiah Queen. The song peaked at No. 22 on the Recorded Music NZ Hot Singles chart and No. 6 on the Hot Christian Songs chart, becoming Queen's first entry into a secular international chart.

Alongside 1K Pson, Frank appeared on a rendition of 1K Phew and Lecrae's song "Move", which was released on September 24, 2025. The song appeared on 1K Phew's seventh studio album, What's Understood 3 (2025). On November 14, 2025, Frank released a Christmas-themed single, "Christmas Morning", with Jvke. Alongside the single's release, he announced that he and Jvke were recording a collaborative full-length Christmas album. The album, This Is What Christmas Feels Like, was released on December 5, 2025. Shortly following the album's release, Frank announced that in the summer of 2026, he would be embarking on The Jesus Generation Tour alongside Tori Kelly, Cory Asbury, and the Figs. Several of the tour's dates sold out within the first day of the presale, and by mid-December had sold nearly 500,000 tickets. Frank's show attendance nearly tripled as a result of the tour's success. It would later go on to become the most successful tour of Christian music to date, drawing more than 519,000 attendees across 29 sold-out stadium and arena shows in just two months.

In 2026, Frank joined former Mission Six member Noah Hayden to form the CCM super duo Party Wave. The duo released their debut single, "SOS" on March 27, 2026, and released their debut album, Dawn Patrol, on April 8, 2026. Subsequently, Frank released the single "Okay!", which was quickly followed by "Jesus Is Alive!". Frank then released an album containing multiple collaborations and renditions of "Jesus Is Alive", titled Jesus Is Alive (Vol. 1), with musicians such as 1K Phew, Limoblaze, and Lost & Found. In October 2026, Frank announced plans to release a documentary in collaboration with Lionsgate, scheduled for release the following year. The documentary, titled The Jesus Generation after the preceding tour of the same name, shared details about the tour. He subsequently announced the release date for an upcoming, eponymously named album, scheduled for release in December 2026.

== Musical style and influence ==
Frank is primarily a contemporary Christian artist who incorporates elements of hip hop, pop, and rock into his music, which critics say is "genre-bending." All of Frank's music is created via Logic Pro on a MacBook. His musical style was primarily influenced by the lack of "cool" Christian music that he experienced while growing up; in an interview with Grammy.com, he remarked:

If I was going to the gym or if I was at the beach, it seemed like there weren't really any Christian songs that would fit those facets of life… I aspired to make Christian music that I think is cool... I'm just making it the way that I love it. I think that authenticity is what kids resonate with.

Frank has been notable for crossing over bringing Christian music into mainstream music through his songs appearing in TikTok and Instagram Reels. Between the combined reigns of Child of God and Child of God II, he has spent the longest time at No. 1 on the Top Christian Albums chart for any act, accounting for 45 weeks. Frank's influence is widely credited as playing a crucial role in attracting younger audiences and those from Generations Z and Alpha towards Christian music.

== Personal life ==
=== Family ===
Frank was born to Hellen Kerrel Keller (née Grantham) and Ronald Frank. He is the grandson of meteorologist Neil Frank. He describes his upbringing as "Baptist/non-denominational". His mother was a worship leader and his grandmother wrote children's music.

Frank is married to Grace Quinn. They were married on March 31, 2020, in a smaller ceremony than initially planned due to the COVID-19 pandemic. They have two children.

=== Education ===
Frank attended Houston Christian High School in Houston and later Baylor University, graduating in 2017 with a bachelor's in business.

=== Religion ===
Frank is affiliated with the non-denominational evangelical Antioch International Movement of Churches, having grown up "in a Baptist/non-denominational home" and having attended Antioch Community Church in Waco, Texas since his sophomore year at Baylor University. He describes ACC Waco as his "home church".

Frank has spoken about his faith including in the track "Testimony" on his album Child of God II, detailing an early life growing up in a Christian household but without having a deep relationship with the faith. During his Child of God Part II tour, he said that some of his hit songs including “Lift My Hands” and “No Longer Bound” are not his own but rather, came to him during prayer.

In an appearance on the Never Had a Bad Day Podcast, Frank explained his inspiration to enter the music industry as a Christian artist. While attending church, a young woman came up and spoke to Frank, claiming that she had experienced a dream in which someone by the name of Forrest Frank began creating Christian music, and would influence the genre in a way that would "change the game."

=== Back injury ===
On July 19, 2025, Frank announced that he had sustained multiple fractures to the L3 and L4 vertebrae in his back after falling off a skateboard while playing with his son. Then on August 3, 2025, Frank released an Instagram Reel, claiming his back was miraculously healed overnight. In the video he is standing, wearing his back brace for precaution Frank states that he ordered an emergency X-Ray, which showed that his L3 and L4 vertebrae were completely healed. Frank accounts this as a miracle from God. His recovery lasted 14 days.

== Discography ==
=== With Surfaces ===
- Surf (2017)
- Where the Light Is (2019)
- Horizons (2020)
- Pacifico (2021)
- Hidden Youth (2022)
- Good Morning (2024)

=== With Party Wave ===
- Dawn Patrol (2026)

=== Solo ===
- Warm (2018)
- Effortless (2020)
- Nostalgia Pack (2023)
- California Cowboy (2023)
- New Hymns (2023)
- A Merry Lofi Christmas (2023)
- Child of God (2024)
- Child of God II (2025)
- The Jesus Generation (2026)

=== Collaborative albums ===
- This Is What Christmas Feels Like (with Jvke, 2025)

== Tours ==
=== As headlining act ===
- Child of God Tour (with Josiah Queen, Nobigdyl, and Antoine Bradford, 2024)
- Child of God Tour Part 2 (with Elevation Rhythm, 2025)
- Jesus Generation Tour (with Tori Kelly, Cory Asbury, and the Figs, 2026)

== Awards and nominations ==
=== ASCAP Awards ===
Year	Nominee / work	Category	Result	Ref.
2026	"Your Way's Better"	Christian Song of the Year	Won	
2026	"Lemonade"	Most Performed Christian Songs	Honored	

=== Grammy Awards ===
Year	Nominee / work	Category	Result	Ref.
2025	Child of God	Best Contemporary Christian Music Album	Nominated	
2026	"Your Way's Better"	Best Contemporary Christian Music Performance/Song	Nominated	
2026	Child of God II	Best Contemporary Christian Music Album	Nominated	

=== GMA Dove Awards ===
Year	Nominee / work	Category	Result	Ref.
2023	"No Longer Bound"	Rap/Hip-Hop Recorded Song of the Year	Nominated	
2024	Forrest Frank	New Artist of the Year	Won	
2024	"Good Day"	Pop/Contemporary Recorded Song of the Year	Won	
2025	"Good Day"	Song of the Year	Nominated	
2025	"UP!"	Song of the Year	Nominated	
2025	Forrest Frank	Songwriter of the Year (Artist)	Nominated	
2025	Forrest Frank	Artist of the Year	Won	
2025	"Heaven on this Earth"	Rap/Hip Hop Recorded Song of the Year	Nominated	
2025	"Your Way's Better"	Pop/Contemporary Recorded Song of the Year	Won	
2025	Child of God	Pop/Contemporary Album of the Year	Won	
2026	Forrest Frank Favorites for Kids	Musical/Choral Collection of the Year	Pending	

=== Billboard Music Awards ===
Year	Nominee / work	Category	Result	Ref.
2024	Child of God	Top Christian Album	Nominated	
2024	Forrest Frank	Top Christian Artist	Nominated	
2024	"Good Day"	Top Christian Song	Nominated	

=== K-Love Fan Awards ===
Year	Nominee/work	Category	Result	Ref.
2024	"Good Day"	Breakout Single of the Year	Nominated	
2025	Forrest Frank	Artist of the Year	Nominated	
2025	Forrest Frank	Male Artist of the Year	Nominated	
2026	"Heaven on My Mind"	Song of the Year	Nominated	

=== Stellar Awards ===
Year	Nominee/work	Category	Result	Ref.
2026	"Move It"	Rap/Hip Hop Song of the Year	Pending	

=== We Love Awards ===
Year	Nominee / work	Category	Result	Ref.
2023	"No Longer Bound"	Mainstream Impact Award	Nominated	
2024	Child of God	Pop Album of the Year	Nominated	
2024	Child of God	Album of the Year	Nominated	
2024	"UP!"	Song of the Year	Nominated	
2024	"Good Day"	Pop Song of the Year	Nominated	
2024	"God Is Good"	Rap/Urban Song of the Year	Won	
2024	"Praises (Remix)" (with Elevation Rhythm)	Collaboration of the Year	Nominated	
2024	Forrest Frank	New Artist/Group of the Year	Nominated	
