= 10K Projects =

American record label

- Parent company: Universal Music Group (2016–2023); Warner Music Group (2023–)
- Founded: 2016
- Founder: Elliot Grainge
- Distributors: Atlantic Music Group; Capitol Records (Ice Spice and Natalie Jane releases); Warner Records (The Living Tombstone and Qbomb releases)
- Genre: Hip-hop; pop; rock
- Country of origin: United States
- Location: Los Angeles, California
- Official website: 10kprojects.com

TenThousand Projects, LLC, doing business as 10K Projects (formerly Strainge Entertainment), is an American record label, founded in 2016 by British record executive Elliot Grainge. It operates under the Atlantic Music Group (AMG) umbrella, which is currently led by Grainge as CEO.

== History ==
The label was founded as Strainge Entertainment by Elliot Grainge in 2016. Grainge is the son of veteran executive Lucian Grainge, who is chairman and CEO of Universal Music Group. After a lawsuit by rapper Tech N9ne in 2017, citing the name similarities of his label Strange Music, the label rebranded as TenThousand Projects, and later shortened to 10K Projects.

Distribution was handled by Universal through Virgin Music Group until September 2023, when the label announced would move to Warner Music Group in a joint-venture.

== Current artists ==
- Abe Parker
- Artemas
- Autumn
- Between Friends
- Billi0n
- Che
- Chezile
- Nafeesisboujee
- Chicken P
- Dro Kenji (jointly with Internet Money and MiraTouch)
- Dthang (jointly with Muddy Entertainment, Coke Boys Records, and GUMBO)
- Forrest Frank (jointly with River House Records and Warner Music Group)
- Gnarls Barkley
- Sinead Harnett
- Hailey Knox
- Ice Spice (jointly with Capitol)
- Icy Narco
- Internet Money
- Jessica Baio
- Journey Montana
- Kenzo Balla
- Ksuuvi
- Natalie Jane (jointly with Capitol)
- Ne-Yo
- OT7 Quanny
- Onlywoke
- Peach Tree Rascals
- Pryme
- Psychic Fever (jointly with LDH Japan and WMG)
- Qbomb (jointly with Warner)
- Rich Amiri (jointly with Internet Money)
- Salem Ilese
- Summrs
- Sunday Scaries
- Surfaces
- The Living Tombstone (jointly with Warner)
- Trippie Redd
- Wade Ward
- Will Swinton
- YG
- Young Khalifa
- YTB Fatt

== Former artists ==
- 6ix9ine
- Capella Grey
- Iann Dior (jointly with Internet Money)
- Fixupboy
- Jaydes
- Poorstacy (jointly with Internet Money)
