= Cory Asbury discography =

- Studio albums: 4
- Live albums: 1
- Singles: 17

American Christian musician Cory Asbury has released four solo studio albums, one collaboration album, one live album, and seventeen singles (including four promotional singles).

== Studio albums ==
List of studio albums, with selected chart positions
Title	Album details	Peak chart positions								Sales
Title	Album details	US	US Christ.	AUS	NZ Heat	SWI	UK C&G	UK Indie	UK Down	Sales
Let Me See Your Eyes	Released: September 1, 2009; Label: Forerunner Music; Format: CD, digital download, streaming	—	—	—	—	—	—	—	—	
Reckless Love	Released: January 26, 2018; Label: Bethel Music; Format: CD, digital download, streaming	53	1	69	7	73	1	11	43	US: 11,000
To Love a Fool	Released: July 31, 2020; Label: Bethel Music; Format: CD, digital download, streaming	— (Note: To Love a Fool did not enter the Billboard 200, but peaked at No. 92 on the Top Album Sales Chart.)	4	—	—	—	15	—	—	US: 4,000
Pioneer	Released: September 15, 2023; Label: BEC Recordings; Format: CD, digital download, streaming	—	8	—	—	—	—	—	—	
Cover to Cover	Released: January 17, 2025; Label: BEC Recordings; Format: CD, Digital download, streaming	—	—	—	—	—	—	—	—	
Outsing The Angels	Released: September 25, 2026; Label: BEC Recordings; Format: Digital download, streaming	—	27	—	—	—	—	—	—	
"—" denotes a recording that did not chart or was not released in that territory.

== Collaborative albums ==
List of collaborative albums
Title	Album details
Holy (with Matt Gilman)	Released: July 10, 2008; Label: Forerunner Music; Format: CD, digital download, streaming

== Live albums ==
List of live albums, with selected chart positions
Title	Album details	Peak chart positions
Title	Album details	US Christ.
To Love a Fool – A Rooftop Experience	Released: November 6, 2020; Label: Bethel Music; Format: Digital download, streaming	20

== Singles ==
List of singles and peak chart positions
Title	Year	Peak chart positions						Certifications	Album
Title	Year	US	US Christ.	US Christ. Airplay	US Christ AC	US Christ Digital	US Christ Stream.	Certifications	Album
"My Beloved" (featuring Jaye Thomas)	2009	—	—	—	—	—	—		Let Me See Your Eyes
"Reckless Love"	2017	— (Note: "Reckless Love" did not enter the Billboard Hot 100, but peaked at No. 3 on the Bubbling Under Hot 100 chart and No. 37 on the Digital Songs chart)	1	1	1	1	1	RIAA: 2× Platinum; RMNZ: Platinum	Reckless Love
"Reckless Love" (featuring Tori Kelly)	2020	—	—	—	—	—	—		Non-album single
"The Father's House"	2020	—	3	1	1	3	10		To Love a Fool
"Christ Be Magnified"	2020	—	—	—	—	—	—		Non-album single
"Egypt" (with Bethel Music)	2020	—	34	—	—	8	—		Revival's in the Air
"Together (Acoustic Version)" (with For King & Country & Rebecca St. James)	2020	—	—	—	—	—	—		Non-album single
"Sparrows"	2020	—	6	7	5	12	12		To Love a Fool
"Dear God"	2020	—	34	—	—	—	—		To Love a Fool
"Repentance (Reimagined)" (with Gable Price and Friends)	2021	—	—	—	—	—	—		The Boxes Humans Made (EP)
"Egypt (Studio Version)"	2021	—	16	12	12	—	—		Non-album single
"Come What May +" (with We Are Messengers)	2021	—	—	—	—	—	—		Wholehearted +
"You Will Be Found" (with Natalie Grant)	2022	— (Note: "You Will Be Found" did not enter the Billboard Hot 100, but peaked at No. 11 on the Billboard Adult Contemporary chart)	10	6	10	3	—		Non-album single
"Kind"	2023	—	21	—	29	2	—		Pioneer
"The Promise is the Same" (with Lori McKenna)	2024	—	—	—	—	—	—		Pioneer (Deluxe Edition)
"Landslide"	2024	—	—	—	—	—	—		Cover to Cover
"Until We Meet Again" (with Dylan Scott)	2024	—	—	—	—	—	—		Pioneer (Deluxe Edition)
"Only Jesus For My Pain" (with Franni Rae)	2024	—	—	—	—	—	—		Pioneer (Deluxe Edition)
"Pioneer" (with Connor Smith)	2024	—	—	—	—	—	—		Pioneer (Deluxe Edition)
"I Hope You Dance"	2024	—	—	—	—	—	—		Cover to Cover
"You're Still the One"	2024	—	—	—	—	—	—		Cover to Cover
"Iris"	2024	—	—	—	—	—	—		Cover to Cover
"Good for Nothing"	2025	—	—	—	—	—	—		Non-album singles
"Dream I Never Had"	2025	—	—	—	—	—	—		Non-album singles
"Cheap Seats"	2025	—	—	—	—	—	—		Non-album singles
"Still Pretty Good"	2025	—	—	—	—	—	—		Non-album singles
"Outsing the Angels"	2026	—	29	—	—	—	—		Outsing the Angels
"—" denotes a recording that did not chart.

=== Promotional singles ===
List of promotional singles and peak chart positions
Title	Year	Peak positions				Album
Title	Year	US	US Christ	US Christ. Airplay	US Christ Digital	Album
"Water and Dust"	2018	—	38	—	—	Reckless Love
"Endless Alleluia"	2018	—	34	—	—	Reckless Love
"Canyons"	2020	—	34	—	—	To Love a Fool
"Homecoming" (with Bethel Music and Gable Price)	2021	—	46	39	—	Homecoming
"These Are the Days"	2023	— (Note: "These Are the Days" did not enter the Billboard Hot 100, but peaked at No. 50 on the Billboard Digital Song sales)	27	—	1	Pioneer
"Misunderstood"	2023	—	—	—	—	Pioneer
"My Inheritance"	2023	—	—	—	—	Pioneer
"Misunderstood" (with Forrest Frank)	2025	—	14	—	5	Child of God II (Back to Back) Deluxe
"—" denotes a recording that did not chart.

== Other charted songs ==
List of charted songs
Title	Year	Peak positions	Album
Title	Year	US Christ. Airplay	Album
"Reason to Praise" (with Bethel Music featuring Naomi Raine)	2022	40	Homecoming

== Other appearances ==
Year	Song	Album	Ref.
2007	"Shine on Us"	Immersed (compilation)	
2007	"Lift Him Up"	Immersed (compilation)	
2007	"Awaken Us"	Immersed (compilation)	
2008	"I Want To Be With You”	Limited Edition, Vol. 20 (compilation)	
2009	"Jesus, Beautiful Savior"	Limited Edition, Vol. 22 (compilation)	
2009	"Where I Belong"	Unceasing: 10 Years of Night & Day Worship (compilation)	
2010	"Where I Belong" (Onething Live and Cory Asbury)	Where I Belong or onething 09 Live	
2010	"My Beloved" (Onething Live, Cory Asbury, and Jaye Thomas)	Where I Belong or onething 09 Live	
2010	"Reason to Dance" (Onething Live, Cory Asbury, and Jaye Thomas)	Where I Belong or onething 09 Live	
2010	"Whom the Son Sets Free" (Onething Live, Cory Asbury, and Laura Hackett Park)	Where I Belong or onething 09 Live	
2010	"No One Else" (Onething Live, Cory Asbury, and Laura Hackett Park)	Where I Belong or onething 09 Live	
2010	"He's Alive" (Forerunner Music, Cory Asbury, and Laura Hackett Park)	Joy	
2010	"Holy Ghost Party" (Forerunner Music and Cory Asbury)	Joy	
2010	"Shekinah" (Forerunner Music, Jaye Thomas, and Cory Asbury)	Joy	
2011	"Lost for Words" (Angela Krüsi featuring Cory Asbury)	Lost for Words	
2011	"Reason to Dance" (Onething Live and Cory Asbury)	Before His Eyes	
2012	"Blessed Are Those" (Cory Asbury featuring Jaye Thomas)	Limited Edition: The Best Of The Prayer Room; Live, Vol. 40: December 2011/January 2012 (compilation)	
2012	"All Is for Your Glory" (Onething Live and Cory Asbury)	Magnificent Obsession	
2012	"Never Gonna Leave Me Dry" (Onething Live & Cory Asbury)	Magnificent Obsession	
2013	"All to Him" (New Life Worship featuring Cory Asbury)	Strong God	
2013	"Ascribe" (New Life Worship featuring Cory Asbury)	Strong God	
2014	"Hallelujah" (Forerunner Music and Cory Asbury)	Endless: Songs of Eternity (compilation)	
2014	"Shine on Us" (Forerunner Music and Cory Asbury)	Endless: Songs of Eternity (compilation)	
2015	"You Are My Hope" (Forerunner Music and Cory Asbury)	Psalms: Songs of David (compilation)	
2015	"Psalm 18" (Forerunner Music and Cory Asbury)	Psalms: Songs of David (compilation)	
2016	"Son of God" (Bethel Music and Cory Asbury)	Have It All	
2018	"Build My Life" (Pat Barrett featuring Cory Asbury)	Build My Life (EP)	
2019	"Endless Alleluia" (Bethel Music and Cory Asbury)	Victory	
2019	"Incontrolable Amor" (Bethel Music and Cory Asbury)	Bethel Music en Español	
2019	"I Just Need U (Tide Electric Remix)" (TobyMac featuring Cory Asbury)	The St. Nemele Collab Sessions	
2020	"Reckless Love" (Bethel Music and Cory Asbury)	Peace	
2020	"Breathe/Rest (Spontaneous)" (Bethel Music and Cory Asbury)	Revival's in the Air	
2022	"Fire's Burnin'" (TobyMac featuring Cory Asbury)	Life After Death	
