= Amen (EP) =

EP by Forrest Frank
- Released: April 25, 2025
- Length: 12:39
- Label: River House Records; 10K Projects
- Producer: Forrest Frank; Pera Krstajić

Forrest Frank chronology
Child of God (2024)	Amen (2025)	Woke Up This Morning (2025)

Singles from Amen
- 1. "Your Way's Better" Released: October 25, 2024; 2. "Nothing Else" Released: January 28, 2025; 3. "No L's" Released: April 11, 2025; 4. "Celebration" Released: April 18, 2025

Amen is an extended play by Forrest Frank, an American pop and hip-hop musician. The EP was released on April 25, 2025, through River House Records and 10K Projects. It features the previously released singles "Your Way's Better", "Nothing Else", "Celebration", and "No L's". The five tracks featured on the extended play were later included on Frank's eighth studio album, Child of God II, released on May 9, 2025.

== Background ==
"Amen" features four previously released singles, "Your Way's Better", "Nothing Else", "Celebration", and "No L's".

The first track released was "Your Way's Better". It was featured on the album Child of God: Deluxe Edition, which was released on November 1, 2024. The song was released on October 25, 2024, initially peaking at No. 19 on the Billboard Hot Christian Songs chart. In early 2025, the song reached a sudden breakout in popularity, proceeding to No. 2 on the Hot Christian Songs and No. 8 on the Bubbling Under Hot 100 Singles. The song's popularity achievement is largely credited to promotion on social media, and a dance derived from the song.

The second track to be released was "Nothing Else", on February 28, 2025. The song featured country music-star Thomas Rhett. "Nothing Else" became a breakout single upon release, charting at No. 14 on the Billboard Digital Song Sales and No. 4 on the Hot Christian Songs, within the first week of release. On April 13, 2025, Rhett famously broke his ankle while performing the song alongside Frank in concert.

The third track to be released, labeled as fourth on the track listing, was "No L's", released on April 11, 2025. "No L's" used a sample of over 10,000 people, recorded at one of Frank's live performances on the Child of God Tour. It achieved a peak of No. 12 on the Billboard Hot Christian Songs chart. The fourth single released, labeled as third on the track listing, was "Celebration", released on April 18, 2025. "Celebration" is Easter-themed in lyrics.

== Writing and production ==
"Your Way's Better" was both written and produced by Forrest Frank and Pera Krstajić, while Frank wrote and produced "Nothing Else" and "Celebration". "No L's" was written by Frank, Krstajić, and Noah Hayden, with Frank and Krstajić handling production. "Amen" was written by Frank, Krstajić, and Zac Lawson, while Frank and Krstajić produced.

== Commercial performance ==
The second track on the single, "Your Way's Better", peaked at No. 8 on the Billboard Bubbling Under Hot 100 Singles chart. The song reached No. 2 on the Hot Christian Songs, No. 30 on the Christian Airplay, and No. 3 on the Christian Digital Song Sales. The song also reached No. 41 on the Billboard TikTok Top 50.

The third track of the single, "Nothing Else" became a breakout single upon release, charting at No. 14 on the Billboard Digital Song Sales, No. 4 on the Hot Christian Songs, and No. 2 on the Christian Digital Song Sales chart, within its first week of release. The fifth track of the single, "No L's" peaked at No. 12 on the Hot Christian Songs chart, and the same position on the Christian Digital Song Sales. "Celebration" peaked at No. 14 on the Hot Christian Songs and No. 9 on the Christian Digital Song Sales.

The EP's title track peaked at No. 15 on the Billboard Hot Christian Songs chart. The extended play reached No. 3 on the Top Christian Albums.

== Track listing ==
No.	Title	Writer(s)	Producer(s)	Length
1.	"Amen"	Forrest Frank; Pera Krstajić; Zac Lawson	Forrest Frank	2:13
2.	"Your Way's Better"	Frank; Krstajić	Frank; Krstajić	3:18
3.	"Nothing Else" (with Thomas Rhett)	Frank	Frank	1:58
4.	"Celebration"	Frank	Frank	2:41
5.	"No L's"	Frank; Noah Hayden; Krstajić	Frank; Krstajić	2:27
Total length:				12:39

== Personnel ==
Adapted from Tidal.

- Amanda Bradshaw – choir
- Forrest Frank – producer, programmer, lead vocals, writer
- Grace Pehrman – choir
- Ilija Mihailovic – choir
- Jacob Morris – mastering, mixing
- Mike Cervantes – mastering
- Noah Hayden – writer
- Pera Krstajić – producer, programmer, writer
- Ray Boukris – engineer
- Thomas Rhett – lead vocals
- Tyler Christian – choir
- Zach Lawson – writer

== Release history ==
Release history for Amen
Region	Version	Date	Format	Label	Ref.
Various	Amen	April 25, 2025	Digital download; streaming	River House Records; 10K Projects	
Various	Child of God II	May 9, 2025	CD; LP; digital download; streaming	River House Records; 10K Projects	
Various	Child of God II (Back to Back) Deluxe	September 5, 2025	CD; LP; digital download; streaming	River House Records; 10K Projects	

== Charts ==
Weekly chart performance for Amen
Chart (2024)	Peak position
US Top Christian Albums (Billboard)	3
