= Misunderstood (Forrest Frank and Cory Asbury song) =

Promotional single by Forrest Frank and Cory Asbury

from the album Child of God II (Back to Back) Deluxe
- Released: August 22, 2025
- Length: 3:50
- Label: River House Records; 10K Projects
- Songwriters: Frank; Asbury; Zac Lawson
- Producers: Frank; Noah Conrad

"Misunderstood" is a song recorded by Forrest Frank and Cory Asbury, for the deluxe edition of Frank's 2025 studio album Child of God II. The song was released as a promotional single on September 4, 2025, via River House Records and Ten Thousand Projects.

== Background ==
On July 19, 2025, Frank announced that, while in a skateboarding accident, he had suffered from multiple back fractures. After noticing a comment on social media asking how he would make music with the injury, he was inspired to record and produce a song themed around the back fracture, while on his hospital bed, resulting in the songs "God's Got My Back" and "Lemonade". Frank teased the songs online, and within three hours, it received several million views, later achieving over 42 million views. Seeing the song's success, he released "God's Got My Back" on July 25 and "Lemonade" on August 1, 2025.

Following the release of these songs, several artists, such as Asbury, Shama Mrema, and Matthew West, released songs satirically parodying Frank's situation, with Asbury's song about recovering from vasectomy and West's about being stung by a bee. Frank responded, criticizing them for making jokes about what he deemed as "the most traumatic moment of my life". Asbury and West released public apologies, with Asbury agreeing to collaborate with Frank to release "Misunderstood". While West had been invited to collaborate, he declined.

== Composition ==
"Misunderstood" was written by Frank, Asbury, and Zac Lawson. The song is composed in the key of D Major with a speed of 110 beats per minute and a time signature of 4/4.

Frank had written the first verse of "Misunderstood" without the help of collaborators. After this, he sent the song to Asbury and requested him to continue the song. While West had been asked to collaborate as well, he declined.

== Commercial performance ==
"Misunderstood" debuted at No. 14 on the Billboard Hot Christian Songs chart and No. 5 on the Christian Digital Song Sales.

== Credits ==
Credits adapted from Tidal Music.

- Cory Asbury – lead vocalist, writer
- Forrest Frank – producer, programmer, lead vocalist, writer
- Jacob "Biz" Morris – masterer
- Noah Conrad – producer, mixer, programmer
- Zac Lawson – writer

== Charts ==
Chart performance for "Misunderstood"
Chart (2025)	Peak position
US Christian Songs (Billboard)	14

== Release history ==
Release history for "Misunderstood"
Region	Release	Date	Format	Label	Ref.
Various	"Misunderstood"	September 4, 2025	Digital download; streaming	River House Records; 10K Projects	
Various	Child of God II (Back to Back) Deluxe	September 5, 2025	CD; LP; digital download; streaming	River House Records; 10K Projects	
