= Bradley Walker (singer) =

American country vocalist

- Born: 1978 (age 47–48); Athens, Alabama
- Genres: Country, Bluegrass
- Occupations: Singer; songwriter
- Years active: 1998–present
- Labels: Gaither Music Group
- Website: bradleywalker.com

Bradley Walker is an American bluegrass and country music singer and songwriter. He has released three solo albums. He is part of the group Brothers of the Heart and has also released three albums with the group.

== Early life ==
Bradley Walker is a native of Athens, Alabama. He was born with muscular dystrophy, and has been in a wheelchair all his life. He was a student at East Limestone High School where he played percussion in the school band.

Walker started singing when he was two or three years old, and began performing in public when he was four. When he was ten, he was invited on stage to perform with The Oak Ridge Boys, and when he was eleven, he sang with The Oak Ridge Boys on The Nashville Network's Nashville Now as well as on the Jerry Lewis MDA Telethon.

He works at the Browns Ferry Nuclear Power Plant as a Material Inventory Coordinator while pursuing a music career.

== Music career ==
In 1998, Walker formed a band, The Trinity Mountain Boys, and began to perform at bluegrass festivals. In 2001, he joined the Georgia-based group Lost Horizon. He was signed to Rounder Records, and released his debut album, Highway of Dreams, in 2006. The album was produced by Carl Jackson. For his performance on the album, he won the Male Vocalist of the Year Award from the International Bluegrass Music Association. He toured on the bluegrass circuit, later working with Joey + Rory.

=== 2016: Call Me Old-Fashioned ===
In March 2016, Walker was signed by Gaither Music following the death of Joey Feek. Walker had known Joey and Rory Feek since 2007, and he was asked by Rory Feek to sing the hymn "Leave It There" at the funeral of Joey Feek in accordance with her wishes. Bill Gaither of the Gaither Music Group, who was also at the funeral service, heard Walker's performance and signed Walker to his label.

Walker's second album, Call Me Old-Fashioned, was produced by Rory Feek and recorded at the Joey + Rory studio out on their farm. The album includes a posthumous duet with Joey Feek, "In The Time That You Gave Me", using vocals she recorded before her death. The album was released on September 23, 2016, and debuted at No. 9 on the Top Country Albums chart.

=== 2017–19: Blessed: Hymns & Songs of Faith ===
On October 6, 2017, Walker released Blessed: Hymns & Songs of Faith. The album, produced by Ben Isaacs, features collaborations with Vince Gill, Alison Krauss, Rhonda Vincent, Jimmy Fortune, The Oak Ridge Boys, The Isaacs and Ricky Skaggs. The album received a GMA Dove Award for the Bluegrass/Country/Roots Album of the Year in 2018.

He also performed a song "Leave It There" in the Homecoming CD/DVD release Give the World A Smile in 2017.

Walker appeared at the Crossroads Guitar Festival 2019 alongside Vince Gill.

=== 2020–present: Brothers of the Heart ===
In 2020, Walker collaborated with Jimmy Fortune, Ben Isaacs, and Mike Rogers to release an album Brotherly Love and a concert DVD/TV special filmed at Rory Feek's barn/studio near Columbia, TN. The album was released digitally on May 29, 2020, and the DVD and CD released on September 4, 2020. The concert film aired on the Circle network on October 20, 2020. The collaboration was successful and they decided to continue with another project, and while they were recording their second album they named their group Brothers of the Heart.

In February 2023, Brothers of the Heart released the second album, Listen To The Music. The album reached No. 5 on the Top Christian Albums chart, and No. 32 on Top Album Sales. Another album, Will The Circle Be Unbroken, was released in November the same year.

== Discography ==
=== Albums ===
Title	Album details	Peak chart positions				Sales
Title	Album details	US	US Country	US Christian	US Bluegrass	Sales
Highway of Dreams	Released: September 12, 2006; Label: Rounder Records; Formats: CD, digital download	—	—	—	10	
Call Me Old-Fashioned	Released: September 23, 2016; Label: Gaither Music Group; Formats: CD, Digital download	155	9	4	1	US: 44,900
Blessed: Hymns & Songs of Faith	Released: October 6, 2017; Label: Gaither Music Group; Formats: CD, Digital download	—	—	18	1	US: 1,800
Brotherly Love (with Jimmy Fortune, Ben Isaacs, and Mike Rogers)	Released: May 28, 2020; Label: Gaither Music Group; Formats: Digital download, CD, DVD	—	—	19	—	
Listen To The Music (as Brothers of the Heart)	Released: January 20, 2023; Label: Gaither Music Group; Formats: Digital download, CD, DVD	—	—	5	—	
Will The Circle Be Unbroken (as Brothers of the Heart)	Released: November 3, 2023; Label: Gaither Music Group; Formats: Digital download, CD, DVD	—				
"—" denotes releases that did not chart

=== Singles ===
Year	Single	Album
2016	"Why Me"	Call Me Old-Fashioned

=== Music videos ===
Year	Video
2006	"A Little Change"

== Awards and nominations ==
Year	Award	Category	Work / Nominee	Result	Refh
2017	GMA Dove Awards	Southern Gospel Recorded Song of the Year	"The Right Hand of Fellowship	Nominated	
2017	GMA Dove Awards	Bluegrass/Country/Roots Recorded Song of the Year	"Don't Give Up on Me"	Nominated	
2017	GMA Dove Awards	Bluegrass/Country/Roots Album of the Year	Call Me Old-Fashioned	Nominated	
2018	GMA Dove Awards	Bluegrass/Country/Roots Recorded Song of the Year	"I Will Someday"	Nominated	
2018	GMA Dove Awards	Bluegrass/Country/Roots Album of the Year	Blessed	Won	
2018	GMA Dove Awards	Southern Gospel Artist of the Year	Himself	Nominated	
2021	GMA Dove Awards	Bluegrass/Country/Roots Recorded Song of the Year	"Go Rest High on That Mountain" – Fortune/Walker/Rogers/Isaacs	Nominated	
