= 49th GMA Dove Awards =

2018 US music awards ceremony

- Date: October 16, 2018
- Location: Allen Arena, Nashville, Tennessee
- Country: United States

Highlights
- Most awards: Tauren Wells (4)
- Most nominations: Colby Wedgeworth (8)
- Website: http://www.doveawards.com

Television/radio coverage
- Network: TBN (October 21, 2018 at 8 p.m. CT)

The 49th Annual GMA Dove Awards presentation ceremony were held on Tuesday, October 16, 2018 at the Allen Arena located in Nashville, Tennessee. The ceremony recognized the accomplishments of musicians and other figures within the Christian music industry for the year 2018. The ceremony was produced by the Trinity Broadcasting Network. The awards show aired on the Trinity Broadcasting Network on Sunday, October 21, 2018 at 8 p.m. CT.

On August 8, 2018, the Gospel Music Association announced with Francesca Battistelli and Travis Greene on Facebook Live, the nominees for the 49th Annual GMA Dove Awards, themed Reverent Wonder. Going into the awards, producer and songwriter Colby Wedgeworth had the most nominations with eight, with Tauren Wells leading the artist nominations with seven nominations. The big winners of the night were Tauren Wells with four awards, with Cory Asbury and Colby Wedgeworth receiving three awards each.

== Performers ==
The following musical artists performed at the 49th GMA Dove Awards:

- 1K Phew
- Trace Adkins
- Cory Asbury
- Big Daddy Weave
- Anthony Brown & group therAPY
- Jekalyn Carr
- Jason Crabb
- Lauren Daigle
- for KING & COUNTRY
- Kirk Franklin
- Koryn Hawthorne
- Joel Houston
- KB
- Tori Kelly
- Natalie Grant
- Newsboys
- Rascal Flatts
- Social Club Misfits
- Rebecca St. James
- The Walls Group
- Tauren Wells
- Zach Williams

== Presenters ==
The following served as presenters at the 49th GMA Dove Awards:

- Trace Adkins
- Pat Barrett
- Ricky Dillard
- Erwin Brothers
- Jordan Feliz
- DeVon Franklin
- Bill Gaither
- Joseph Habedank
- Israel Houghton
- Joel Houston
- Michael Huppe (SoundExchange)
- Brian & Jenn Johnson
- Dr. Bobby Jones
- Tasha Cobbs Leonard
- Mark Lowry
- Matt Maher
- Jonathan McReynolds
- Bart Millard
- Jasmine Murray
- Chonda Pierce
- Rebecca St. James
- Marvin Sapp
- Russ Taff
- Chris Tomlin
- The Walls Group
- Matthew West
- Brian Courtney Wilson
- Deborah Joy Winans

== Nominees and winners ==
This is a complete list of the nominees for the 49th GMA Dove Awards. The winners are in bold.

=== General ===
Song of the Year

- "All My Hope"
  - (writers) David Crowder, Ed Cash (publishers) Alletrop Music, Inot Music, sixsteps Music, worshiptogether.com songs
- "Blessings"
  - (writers) Allen Swoope, Asheton Hogan, Lecrae Moore, Maurice Simmonds, Tyrone Williams Griffin, Jr. (publishers) Asheton Hogan BMI Pub Designee, Eardrummers Entertainment LLC, Warner-Tamerlane Publishing Corp.
- "Broken Things"
  - (writers) Andrew Jacob Pruis, Jason Houser, Matthew West (publisher) Housermania Music
- "Control (Somehow You Want Me)"
  - (writers) Jason Ingram, Matt Bronleewe, Mike Donehey (publishers) Fellow Ships Music, No Alibis Publishing, So Essential Tunes
- "Different"
  - (writers) Kyle Lee, Micah Tyler (publishers) Fair Trade Global Songs, Fair Trade Tunes, From The Void
- "Hills and Valleys"
  - (writers) Chuck Butler, Jonathan Smith, Tauren Wells (publishers) Be Essential Songs, Crucial Music Entertainment, Jord A Lil Music, Not Just Another Song Publishing, So Essential Tunes
- "I just need U."
  - (writers) Blake NeeSmith, Bryan Fowler, Kevin McKeehan (publisher) Achtober Songs, Blake Neesmith Publishing Designee, RELWOF, So Essential Tunes
- "I'll Find You"
  - (writers) Danny Majic, John Mitchell, Justin Franks, Lecrae Moore, Natalie Sims, Sasha Sloan, Victoria Kelly (publishers) Artist 101 Publishing Group, Artist Publishing Group West, Danny Majic Music Publishing, Eardrummers Entertainment LLC, J Franks Publishing, John Mitchell Pub Designee, Mod Junkie, Sasha Sloan Publishing, Warner-Tamerlane Publishing Corp., WB Music Corp.
- "O'Lord"
  - (writers) Joe Williams, Paul Mabury (publishers) FLYCHILD Publishing, Joe Williams Publishing Designee, So Essential Tunes
- "Old Church Choir"
  - (writers) Colby Wedgeworth, Ethan Hulse, Zach Williams (publishers) Anthems of Hope, Be Essential Songs, Colby Wedgeworth Music, EGH Music, Fair Trade Music Publishing, Wisteria Drive
- **"Reckless Love"**
  - **(writers) Caleb Culver, Cory Asbury, Ran Jackson (publisher) Bethel Music Publishing, Richmond Park Publishing, Watershed Music Publishing**
- "So Will I (100 Billion X)"
  - (writers) Benjamin Hastings, Joel Houston, Michael Fatkin (publisher) Capitol CMG Publishing, Hillsong Music Publishing
- "Unfinished"
  - (writers) Ben Glover, Colby Wedgeworth (publisher) 9t One Songs, Ariose Music, Colby Wedgeworth Music, Fair Trade Music Publishing

Worship Song of the Year

- "Do It Again"
  - (writers) Chris Brown, Mack Brock, Matt Redman, Steven Furtick (publishers) Capitol CMG Publishing, Essential Music Publishing
- **"Reckless Love"**
  - **(writers) Caleb Culver, Cory Asbury, Ran Jackson (publishers) Bethel Music Publishing, Richmond Park Publishing, Watershed Music Publishing**
- "So Will I (100 Billion X)"
  - (writers) Benjamin Hastings, Joel Houston, Michael Fatkin (publishers) Capitol CMG Publishing, Hillsong Music Publishing
- "Spirit of the Living God"
  - (writers) Jacob Sooter, Mia Fieldes (publisher) Essential Music Publishing
- "Tremble"
  - (writers) Andres Figueroa, Hank Bentley, Mariah McManus, Mia Fieldes (publisher) Essential Music Publishing

Songwriter of the Year

- Lecrae
- **Matthew West**
- Tauren Wells
- TobyMac
- Zach Williams

Songwriter of the Year (Non-artist)

- Bryan Fowler
- **Colby Wedgeworth**
- Ethan Hulse
- Jason Ingram
- Jonathan Smith

Contemporary Christian Artist of the Year

- for KING & COUNTRY, Word Label Group
- MercyMe, Fair Trade Services
- **Tauren Wells, Provident Music Group**
- TobyMac, Capitol CMG
- Zach Williams, Essential Records

Southern Gospel Artist of the Year

- Bradley Walker, Gaither Music Group
- **Gaither Vocal Band, Gaither Music Group**
- Joseph Habedank, Daywind Records
- Karen Peck & New River, Daywind Records
- Mark Lowry, Daywind Records

Gospel Artist of the Year

- CeCe Winans, Pure Springs Gospel / Thirty Tigers
- Jekalyn Carr, Lunjeal Music Group
- Kirk Franklin, RCA Inspiration
- **Tasha Cobbs Leonard, Motown Gospel**
- Travis Greene, RCA Inspiration

Artist of the Year

- Hillsong UNITED, Hillsong Music Australia / Capital CMG
- MercyMe, Fair Trade Services

NEEDTOBREATHE, Atlantic Records

- Tasha Cobbs Leonard, Motown Gospel
- **Zach Williams, Provident Label Group**

New Artist of the Year

- Cory Asbury, Bethel Music
- Koryn Hawthorne, RCA Inspiration
- Mosaic MSC, Essential Worship
- Pat Barrett, Capitol CMG
- **Tauren Wells, Provident Label Group**

Producer of the Year

- Ed Cash
- David Garcia
- Tommee Profitt
- Wayne Haun
- **Jason Ingram and Paul Mabury (Team)**
- Kenneth Leonard Jr. and Natasha Leonard (Team)

=== Rap/Hip Hop ===
Rap/Hip Hop Recorded Song of the Year

- "Not Today Satan (feat. Andy Mineo)" – KB
  - (writers) Andrew Mineo, Chris Mackey, Jacob Cardec, Joseph Prielozny, Kevin Burgess
- **"War Cry (feat. Tauren Wells)" – Social Club Misfits**
  - **(writers) Andrew Wells, David Frank, Fernando Miranda, John Thomas Roach, Martin Santiago, Tommee Profitt**
- "SMILE" – Tedashii
  - (writers) Lasanna Harris, Marquis Rachad, Philip Green, Shama Joseph, Tedashii Anderson
- "Forever" – Trip Lee
  - (writers) Jacob Cardec, William Barfield
- "Praying Hands (feat. Trip Lee)" – Ty Brasel
  - (writers) Kenneth Christian Mackey, Ty Brasel

Rap/Hip Hop Album of the Year

- **Today We Rebel – KB**
  - **(producers) Benjamin Backus, Chris "Dirty Rice" Mackey, Clinton Lightfoot, David L. Baker, Dominique Hubbard, G Roc, Howard Reeves, Jacob Cardec, Joseph Prielozny, Mykallife, William Josiah**
- Crooked – Propaganda
  - (producers) Courtland Urbano, Daniel Steele, JR
- Into the Night – Social Club Misfits
  - (producers) 42 North, Andrew Wells, Beam, Ben Lopez, Daniel Steele, Elvin Wit Shahbazian, Jaime Zeluck Hindlin, Rey King

=== Rock/Contemporary ===
Rock/Contemporary Recorded Song of the Year

- **"Walking on Water" – NEEDTOBREATHE**
  - **(writers) Bear Rinehart, Bo Rinehart, Matt Maher**
- "Gone" – RED
  - (writers) Anthony Armstrong, Jason McArthur, Michael Barnes, Randy Armstrong, Rob Graves
- "Brave" – Skillet
  - (writers) John Cooper, Korey Cooper, Seth Mosley

Rock/Contemporary Album of the Year

- Everything Or Nothing – Carrollton
  - (producers) Carrollton, John Mays, Scott Cash
- Gone – Red
  - (producer) Rob Graves
- **Unleashed Beyond – Skillet**
  - **(producers) Brian Howes, Death Tiger, Jerricho Scroggins, Kane Churko, Kevin Churko, Mike X O'Connor, Seth Mosley, Solomon Olds**

=== Pop/Contemporary ===
Pop/Contemporary Recorded Song of the Year

- "All My Hope" – Crowder
  - (writers) David Crowder, Ed Cash
- "O'Lord" – Lauren Daigle
  - (writers) Joe Williams, Paul Mabury
- "When We Pray" – Tauren Wells
  - (writers) Colby Wedgeworth, Ethan Hulse, Tauren Wells
- "I just need U." – TobyMac
  - (writers) Blake NeeSmith, Bryan Fowler, Toby McKeehan
- **"Old Church Choir" – Zach Williams**
  - **(writers) Colby Wedgeworth, Ethan Hulse, Zach Williams**

Pop/Contemporary Album of the Year

- Wonder – Hillsong United
  - (producers) Joel Houston, Michael Guy Chislett
- Out of the Dark – Mandisa
  - (producers) Ben Glover, Bryan Fowler, Christopher Stevens, Colby Wedgeworth, David Garcia, Mike X O'Connor, Seth Mosley
- All In – Matthew West
  - (producers) AJ Pruis, David Garcia, Pete Kipley
- Different – Micah Tyler
  - (producers) Colby Wedgeworth, Hank Bentley, Kyle Lee
- **Hills and Valleys – Tauren Wells**
  - **(producers) Bernie Herms, Brent Milligan, Casey Brown, Chuck Butler, Colby Wedgeworth, Jordan Sapp**

=== Southern Gospel ===
Southern Gospel Recorded Song of the Year

- "He Can Take It" – Brian Free & Assurance
  - (writers) Jeff Bumgardner, Kenna Turner West, Sue C. Smith
- "Clear Skies" – Ernie Haase & Signature Sound
  - (writers) Becca Mizell, Sam Mizell
- "Hallelujah Band" – Gaither Vocal Band
  - (writers) Becca Mizell, Sam Mizell
- **"Washed By The Water" – Jason Crabb**
  - **(writers) Dave Barnes, Jason Crabb, Jordan Reynolds**
- "Just When You Thought" – Joseph Habedank
  - (writers) Joseph Habedank, Michael Farren, Wayne Haun

Southern Gospel Album of the Year

- Clear Skies – Ernie Haase & Signature Sound
  - (producers) Kris Crunk, Michael English, Trey Ivey, Virgil Stratford, Wayne Haun
- We Have This Moment – Gaither Vocal Band
  - (producers) Bill Gaither, Gordon Mote
- Still Happy – Goodman Revival
  - (producers) Johnny Minick, Michael Sykes, Tanya Goodman Sykes
- Hope For All Nations – Karen Peck & New River
  - (producer) Wayne Haun
- **What's Not To Love – Mark Lowry**
  - **(producer) Dony McGuire**

=== Bluegrass/Country/Roots ===
Bluegrass/Country/Roots Recorded Song of the Year

- "I Will Someday (feat. The Isaacs)" – Bradley Walker
  - (writers) Chris Stapleton, Garnet Bowman, Morgane Hayes, Ronnie Bowman
- "Little White Church House" – Gaither Vocal Band
  - (writers) Jonathan Smith, Mia Fieldes, Zach Williams
- "Jailbreak" – Joseph Habedank
  - (writers) Gerald Crabb, Joseph Habedank
- **"Dinner on the Ground (feat. the Oak Ridge Boys)" – Little Roy & Lizzy Show**
  - **(writers) Jeff Bumgardner, Joel Lindsey, Wayne Haun**
- "Daddy And Son" – The Nelons
  - (writers) Dony McGuire, Jason Clark, Reba Rambo-McGuire

Bluegrass/Country/Roots Album of the Year

- **Blessed, Hymns and Songs of Faith – Bradley Walker**
  - **(producers) Ben Isaacs**
- Sing It Again, A Collection of Favorites – Jeff & Sheri Easter
  - (producers) Greg Cole, Jeff Easter, Sheri Easter
- Going Home – Little Roy & Lizzy Show
  - (producer) Jeff Easter, Trey Ivey, Wayne Haun

=== Contemporary Gospel/Urban ===
Contemporary Gospel/Urban Recorded Song of the Year

- "I Got That" – Anthony Brown & Group therAPy
  - (writer) Anthony Brown
- "A Great Work" – Brian Courtney Wilson
  - (writers) Aaron W. Lindsey, Alvin Richardson, Brian Courtney Wilson
- "Not Lucky, I'm Loved" – Jonathan McReynolds
  - (writers) Jonathan McReynolds, Terrell Demetrius Wilson
- **"Won't He Do It" – Koryn Hawthorne and Roshon Fegan**
  - (writer) Loren Hill, Makeba Riddick, Rich Shelton
- "You (feat. Tye Tribbett)" – Snoop Dogg
  - (writers) Jovan J. Dawkins, Jevon Hill, Stanley Green Jr, Timothy Tyrone Bush Jr, Tye Tribbett

Contemporary Gospel/Urban Album of the Year

- **A Long Way From Sunday – Anthony Brown & group therAPy**
  - **(producers) Adam Blackstone, Anthony Brown, Dana Sorey, Darryl Woodson Jr., Justin Savage, Warryn Campbell, Wow Jones**
- A Great Work – Brian Courtney Wilson
  - (producers) Aaron Lindsey, Luther "Mano" Hanes, Shuan Martin, Warryn Campbell
- Make Room – Jonathan McReynolds
  - (producers) Darryl "Lil' Man" Howell, Jonathan McReynolds
- Snoop Dogg Presents Bible of Love – Snoop Dogg
  - (producers) B. Slade, Chris Johnson, Demetrius Sims, Derrick John, DJ Battlecat, Elvis "Blac Elvis" Williams, J Drew Sheard II, Jeremy Eudovique, Jevon Hill, John P Kee, Jovan Dawkins, KJ Conteh, Koshine, Lt Hutton, Lue, Scrapdolla, Soopafly, Stanley Green Jr, The B Wagon, Tony Russel, Tyrell Urquhart, Uncle Chucc, Warryn Campbell
- The Bloody Win – Tye Tribbett
  - (producer) Jevon Hill, Tye Tribbett

=== Traditional Gospel ===
Traditional Gospel Recorded Song of the Year

- "Stay With Me" – Jekalyn Carr
  - (writer) Jekalyn Carr
- **"Close" – Marvin Sapp**
  - **(writer) Aaron Lindsey, Marvin Sapp, Solomon Edwards Jr**
- "I Survived It" – Ricky Dillard & New G
  - (writers) Jason Clayborn, Ricky Dillard
- "And You Don't Stop" – The Walls Group
  - (writers) Affion Crockett, Ahjah Walls, Alic Walls, Eric Dawkins, Warryn Campbell
- "He Got Up (feat. Dorinda Clark-Cole)" – VaShawn Mitchell
  - (writer) VaShawn Mitchell

Traditional Gospel Album of the Year

- **One Nation Under God – Jekalyn Carr**
  - **(producer) Allen Carr**
- 10 – Ricky Dillard & New G
  - (producers) Ricky Dillard, Michael Taylor, Will Bogle
- The Brooklyn Tabernacle Choir – I Am Reminded
  - (producers) Carol Cymbala, Bradley Knight

=== Urban Worship ===
Urban Worship Recorded Song of the Year

- "The Name Of Our God" – Tasha Cobbs Leonard
  - (writers) Jonas Myrin, Matt Redman, Natasha Leonard
- "Your Great Name" – Todd Dulaney
  - (writers) Dontaniel Jamel Kimbrough, Todd Dulaney
- **"You Waited" – Travis Greene**
  - **(writer) Travis Greene**

Urban Worship Album of the Year

- **Heart. Passion. Pursuit. – Tasha Cobbs Leonard**
  - **(producers) Kenneth Leonard Jr., Natasha Leonard**
- Your Great Name – Todd Dulaney
  - (producers) Todd Dulaney, Dontaniel Jamel Kimbrough
- Crossover: Live From Music City – Travis Greene
  - (producers) Jevon Hill, Travis Greene

=== Spanish ===
Spanish Language Recorded Song of the Year

- **"Sin Ti" – Alex Zurdo**
  - **(writer) Alexis Velez**
- "Dame Más" – Genessis & Nikki
  - (writers) Andy Delos Santos, Genessis Holguin, Nikki Holguin, Phil Sillas
- "Lléname (feat. Evan Craft)" – Harold y Elena
  - (writers) Elena Witt-Guerra, Harold Guerra
- "Danzo en el Río" – Miel San Marcos
  - (writers) Josh Morales, Luis Morales Jr
- "Agradecido (feat. Alex Campos)" – Ray Alonso
  - (writers) Ray Alonso, Yafet González, Emmanuel Espinosa

Spanish Album of the Year

- Impulso – Evan Craft
  - (producer) Sean Cook
- Revive (Spanish Version) – Lucia Parker
  - (producers) Israel Houghton, Jake Salomon
- Cerca Estás – Marcela Gandara
  - (producers) Leslie Johnson, Marcela Gandara
- Jesús Salva – Marcos Witt
  - (producers) Coalo Zamorano, Marcos Witt, Sergio Gonzalez, Pauly García
- **Pentecostés – Miel San Marcos**
  - **(producers) Josue Morales, Luis Morales Jr., Samy Morales, Chris Rocha**

=== Worship ===
Worship Recorded Song of the Year

- "Resurrection Power" – Chris Tomlin
  - (writers) Ed Cash, Ryan Ellis, Tony Brown
- "Reckless Love" – Cory Asbury
  - (writers) Caleb Culver, Cory Asbury, Ran Jackson (publishers) Bethel Music Publishing, Richmond Park Publishing, Watershed Music Publishing
- **"So Will I (100 Billion X)" – Hillsong UNITED**
  - **(writers) Benjamin Hastings, Joel Houston, Michael Fatkin**
- "Who You Say I Am" – Hillsong Worship
  - (writers) Ben Fielding, Reuben Morgan
- "Tremble" – Mosaic MSC
  - (writers) Andres Figueroa, Hank Bentley, Mariah McManus, Mia Fieldes

Worship Album of the Year

- **Reckless Love – Cory Asbury**
  - **(producers) Jason Ingram, Paul Mabury**
- There Is More – Hillsong Worship
  - (producers) Michael Guy Chislett, Brooke Ligertwood
- Love Has a Name – Jesus Culture
  - (producer) Jeremy Edwardson
- Good News – Rend Collective
  - (producers) Gareth Gilkeson, Bryan Fowler, Ed Cash, Ben Tan, Michael Fatkin
- Bright Faith Bold Future – Vertical Worship
  - (producer) Jonathan Smith

=== Other categories ===
Instrumental Album of the Year

- Piano Chill: Songs of Faith – Christopher Phillips
  - (producer) Jack Jezzro
- **A Thankful Heart – Craig Duncan**
  - **(producer) Craig Duncan**
- I'm Gonna Keep On – Jeff Stice
  - (producer) Jeff Stice

Children's Album of the Year

- **Bright Ones – Bright Ones**
  - **(producers) Jacob Sooter, James G. Morales, Lael, Mike X O'Connor, Rick Seibold, Seth Mosley**
- Be Held: Lullabies For The Beloved – Christy Nockels
  - (producer) Nathan Nockels
- Getty Kids Hymnal – For the Cause – Keith & Kristyn Getty
  - (producers) Keith Getty, Kristyn Getty, Fionan deBarra
- Kathie Lee Gifford Presents The Little Giant – Kathie Lee Gifford
  - (producers) David Pomeranz, Mark Cabaniss, Kathie Lee Gifford
- Mommy & Me Worship 2 – LifeWay
  - (producers) Craig Adams, Lynsey Delp

Christmas / Special Event Album of the Year

- It's Finally Christmas – Casting Crowns
  - (producer) Mark A. Miller
- **Christmas | Live In Phoenix – for KING & COUNTRY**
  - **(producer) for KING & COUNTRY**
- The Peace Project – Hillsong Worship
  - (producers) Michael Guy Chislett, Ben Tan
- Light of Christmas – TobyMac
  - (producers) Bryan Fowler, David Garcia
- Country Roots and Gospel Favorites (Live) – Various Artists
  - (producers) Bill Gaither

Musical of the Year

- Christmas Is in the Heart
  - (creators) Dale Mathews, Kenna Turner West, Steve W. Mauldin
- **How to Have the Best Christmas Ever**
  - **(creators) Daniel Semsen, Heidi Petak, Jeff Bumgardner, Joel Lindsey**
- It Happened On A Sunday
  - (creators) Camp Kirkland, Cliff Duren, Jason Cox, Phil Nitz
- Love Took His Breath Away
  - (creators) Bradley Knight, Joel Lindsey
- Miracle In A Manger
  - (creators) Camp Kirkland, Cliff Duren, Phil Nitz, Tim Lovelace

Youth / Children's Musical of the Year

- **Angels Say What?!**
  - **(creators) Alisen Wells, Anna Clark, Nick Robertson**
- My Savior Lives
  - (creators) Dale Mathews, Dana Anderson
- Nailed it!
  - (creators) Alisen Wells, Anna Clark, Nick Robertson

Choral Collection of the Year

- Horizon
  - (creators) Prestonwood Choir
- The Big Red Choir Book
  - (creators) Dale Mathews
- The Reason
  - (creators) Travis Cottrell
- Turn Your Radio On
  - (creators) Marty Parks
- **Your Word**
  - **(creators) Cliff Duren, Jeff Bumgardner**

Recorded Music Packaging of the Year

- Resurrection Letters: Vol. I – Andrew Peterson
  - (art director) Joshua Wurzelbacher (graphic designer) Brannon McAllister (photographer) Giles Clement (illustrator) Stephen Crotts
- Bright Ones – Bright Ones
  - (art director) Lindsey Strand (graphic designer) Stephen Hart (photographer) Lucas Sankey
- Where His Light Was – Kristene DiMarco
  - (art director) Kiley Goodpasture (graphic designer) Brianna Ailie (photographer) Stephen Hart and Lucas Sankey
- **Decade The Halls, Vol I – Tenth Avenue North**
  - **(art director) Tim Parker (photographer) Eric Brown**
- The Other Side – The Walls Group
  - (Art Director) Tim Parker (graphic designer) David Navejas (photographer) Blair Campbell

=== Videos and Films ===
Short Form Video of the Year

- Love Won't Let Me Down – Hillsong Young & Free
  - (director) Jamin Tasker (producer) Johnny Rays
- **I'll Find You (feat. Tori Kelly) – Lecrae**
  - **(director) Mike Mihail (producers) Danny Majic, DJ Frank E**
- Gone – RED
  - (director) Matt DeLisi (producer) Ryan Atenhan
- Dive (feat. Beam) – Social Club Misfits
  - (director and producer) Caleb Natale
- Blackout – Steffany Gretzinger
  - (director) Bommy Kwon (producer) Lindsey Strand
- I just need U. – TobyMac
  - (director) Eric Welch (producer) Andrew Molina

Long Form Video of the Year

- **There Is More – Hillsong Worship**
  - **(director) Sebastian Strand (producer) Ben Field**
- Love Has a Name – Jesus Culture
  - (director and producer) Nathan Grubbs
- The Garden Tour (Live) – Kari Jobe
  - (director and producer) Ezra Cohen
- Whole Heart (Live) – Passion
  - (director) Rusty Anderson, (producers) Leighton Ching, Shelley Giglio
- Country Roots and Gospel Favorites – Various Artists
  - (director) Doug Stuckey (producer) Bill Gaither

Inspirational Film of the Year

- God's Not Dead: A Light in Darkness
  - (director) Michael Mason (producer) Pure Flix Productions
- **I Can Only Imagine**
  - **(directors) The Erwin Brothers (producers) City on a Hill Productions, Imagine Rights, Kevin Downes Productions, LD Entertainment, Mission Pictures International, Toy Gun Films**
- Paul, Apostle of Christ
  - (director) Andrew Hyatt (producers) Affirm Films, ODB Films
- Same Kind of Different As Me
  - (director) Michael Carney (producers) Disruption Entertainment, One October Films, Paramount Pictures, Reserve Entertainment, Skodam Films
- The Star
  - (director) Timothy Reckart (producers) Affirm Films, Columbia Pictures Corporation, Franklin Entertainment, Sony Pictures Animation, The Jim Henson Company, Walden Media
