= Canyons (song) =

Promotional single by Cory Asbury

from the album To Love a Fool
- Released: July 17, 2020
- Recorded: 2019–2020
- Genre: Contemporary worship music
- Length: 4:40
- Label: Bethel Music
- Songwriters: Cory Asbury; Ethan Hulse
- Producer: Paul Mabury

Music videos
- "Canyons" (Acoustic) on YouTube
- "Canyons" (Live) on YouTube

"Canyons" is a song performed by American contemporary worship musician Cory Asbury which was released as a promotional single to Asbury's third studio album, To Love a Fool (2020), on July 17, 2020. Asbury collaborated with Ethan Hulse in writing the song, and the production of the single was handled by Paul Mabury.

== Background ==
On June 29, 2020, Asbury unveiled the name and artwork of the then-upcoming album, To Love a Fool, with the release date slated for July 31, 2020. Asbury held an election-style contest for the release of a song from the album, asking fans to vote between "Canyons" and "Sparrows", with the winning song being slated for release on July 10, 2020. The contest was set on July 2. "Sparrows" won the contest and was released as the first promotional single from the album, concurrently launching the album's pre-order. "Canyons" was subsequently released as the second and final promotional single of To Love a Fool on July 18, 2020. On November 6, 2020, Asbury released the live version of "Canyons" as part of his album, To Love a Fool – A Rooftop Experience (2020).

== Composition ==
"Canyons" is composed in the key of A♭ with a tempo of 94 beats per minute and a musical time signature of 4/4.

== Commercial performance ==
"Canyons" debuted at number thirty-seven on the US Hot Christian Songs chart dated August 11, 2020. The song peaked at number thirty-four on the August 29-dated chart.

== Music videos ==
Asbury published with the audio video of "Canyons" on YouTube on July 17, 2020. Asbury then released the acoustic performance video of the song, which was recorded in his loft in downtown Kalamazoo, Michigan, on July 20, 2020. On November 6, 2020, Asbury published the live performance video of the song, which was recorded on a rooftop in Kalamazoo, Michigan.

== Charts ==
Chart performance for "Canyons"
Chart (2020)	Peak position
US Hot Christian Songs (Billboard)	34
