= Reckless Love (Cory Asbury album) =

Studio album by Cory Asbury
- Released: January 26, 2018
- Recorded: 2017
- Studio: Spencer Creek Studio, Franklin, TN
- Genre: Worship; CCM
- Length: 41:45
- Label: Bethel Music
- Producer: Jason Ingram; Paul Mabury

Cory Asbury chronology
Let Me See Your Eyes (2009)	Reckless Love (2018)	To Love a Fool (2020)

Singles from Reckless Love
- 1. "Reckless Love" Released: October 27, 2017

Reckless Love is the second solo studio album by American Christian worship musician Cory Asbury, and his third album overall. Bethel Music released the album on January 26, 2018, his first full-length release with the label. Asbury worked with Jason Ingram and Paul Mabury in the production of the album.

Preceded by the release of the album's popular title track as a single in October 2017, Reckless Love was released to critical acclaim, while achieving commercial success with a No. 1 debut on Billboard's Christian Albums chart in the United States, as well as the OCC's Official Christian & Gospel Albums Chart in the United Kingdom, with top 100 mainstream chart entries in Australia, Switzerland and the United States. Reckless Love won the Worship Album of Year at the 49th Dove Awards in 2018. It was nominated for Top Christian Album at the 2019 Billboard Music Awards.

== Background ==
Cory Asbury started out as a worship leader with the International House of Prayer in Kansas City from 2005 and appeared on several IHOP-KC releases. He released a duet album with Matt Gilman titled Holy in 2008, followed by his solo debut called Let Me See Your Eyes in 2009 via the IHOP-affiliated label, Forerunner Music. In 2012, Cory Asbury moved from Kansas City to Colorado Springs, Colorado to join New Life Church as worship pastor where he served as a worship leader with New Life Worship and Desperation Band. He featured on New Life Worship's Strong God (2013), and co-wrote some songs on Banner (2014) as a Desperation Band member.

Asbury joined the Bethel Music collective in May 2015 and made his first appearance on a Bethel Music collective release performing the song "Son of God" on their eighth live album, Have It All (2016). In December 2016, he moved to Kalamazoo, Michigan to serve as a worship pastor of Radiant Church. After a nine-year solo hiatus, he released Reckless Love in January 2018, an album that is described as "a whole-hearted telling of an essential story in Scripture: a Father's desire for connection with the ones he made, knows, and relentlessly loves." The album is said to have been inspired by the lessons that Asbury learnt in his journey from boyhood to manhood.

== Artwork and packaging ==
In a post on Bethel Music's Instagram page regarding the cover art for the album and the single, Cory Asbury expressed that he had to become a father to learn how to become a son. He shared that the cover of the single "Reckless Love" signified an introduction to his personal story, saying "The beginning. The genesis. An innocent little boy with goofy, spiky hair and not a care in the world. Just a little kid. A son. No worries. No wounds. Carefree and confident in the perfect little world my parents provided for me." Asbury then stated that the album cover denotes his life coming full circle, saying:

On the journey from boyhood to manhood there were a million cracks in the road. But somehow the grace of God swooped in with wings otherworldly and carried me safely over each one. And finally, those mighty wings set me down in a broad place. Now I'm a father to my own little boy. And somehow, in so becoming, I'm a little child again. Fully free and fully alive in my Father's eyes. The brokenness didn't break me. No, we rewrote the story in crimson ink. And I dance again like a little boy. Nothing between us. Innocent and free just like You always wanted. And I realize I've always been the dream of Your heart. A son.

— Cory Asbury, via Bethel Music's Instagram feed

== Promotion ==
Bethel Music announced the commencement of the album's pre-order period on January 5, 2018, with "Endless Alleluia", "Reckless Love" and "Water and Dust" being released as promotional singles as they were availed for instant download.

== Singles ==
Cory Asbury released "Reckless Love" via Bethel Music on October 27, 2017 as the lead single from the album. A version of "Reckless Love" adapted for radio airplay was released in digital format on January 5, 2018. Three weeks prior to its impact date, the song was already spinning on radio stations across the United States.

== Critical reception ==
Professional ratings
Review scores
Source	Rating
Hallels	3.5/5 stars

Reviewing for Eden.co.uk, Aaron Lewendon concluded that "Through Reckless Love, God's strength is liked not to a celestial force, but to the limitless resolve of the most loving of parents. It's a love that conquers death, that brings freedom, and that brings the one thing we've been searching all our lives for; security." Timothy Yap, reviewing the album for Hallels whilst rating it three-point-five-out-of-five, believes that "the album abounds with great worship moments." AllMusic's Neil Z. Yeung described the album as presenting a "passionate and yearning message with uplifting midtempo numbers that recall secular bands like Coldplay, OneRepublic, and The Script." Jay Wright of NewReleaseToday concluded in his review of the album: "Every word and every line Cory Asbury sings in Reckless Love resonates with the warm and gentle love of God. Cory describes our Father as One who is passionate and will stop at nothing to win our hearts. Serene melodies mix with stunning harmonies to bring an album that invites the listener to sit back and simply receive God's unending love. Reckless Love has certainly been worth the wait!"

=== Accolades ===
Year	Organization	Award	Result	Ref.
2018	GMA Dove Awards	Worship Album of the Year	Won	
2019	Billboard Music Awards	Top Christian Album	Nominated	

== Commercial performance ==
In the United States, the week ending February 1, 2018 saw Reckless Love garnering sales of 11,000 equivalent album units, and as a result topping the Billboard Christian Albums chart. Reckless Love is Cory Asbury's debut album on the Christian albums chart and his first No. 1 release on the chart. The album was also the fifth best-selling digital album in the same week, attained No. 4 on the Independent Albums chart, whilst registering on the all-inclusive Billboard 200 chart at No. 53.

In Australia, Reckless Love debuted at No. 69 in the week ending February 4, 2018 on the ARIA Albums Chart.

Reckless Love also became Cory Asbury's chart-topping debut on the OCC's Official Christian & Gospel Albums Chart for the best-selling releases of the genre in the United Kingdom, achieving the No. 1 spot in the week ending February 8, 2018.

== Track listing ==
Reckless Love
No.	Title	Writer(s)	Length
1.	"Reckless Love"	Caleb Culver; Cory Asbury; Ran Jackson	5:33
2.	"Water and Dust"	C. Asbury	3:33
3.	"You Won't Let Go"	C. Asbury; Jason Ingram; Brian Johnson; Culver	3:34
4.	"Endless"	C. Asbury; Ingram; Mia Fieldes; Hank Bentley	3:57
5.	"Death Where Is Your Sting"	C. Asbury; Anna Asbury; Ingram; Paul Mabury; Aodhan King; Bede Benjamin-Korporaal	4:40
6.	"Only Takes a Moment"	C. Asbury; Ingram; Mabury	3:32
7.	"Garments"	C. Asbury; Nate Moore; Tony Brown	3:43
8.	"Your Love Is Strong"	C. Asbury; Daniel Laguna; Veronica Harris; Culver	4:36
9.	"Born Again"	Amanda Cook; C. Asbury; Steffany Gretzinger	4:12
10.	"Endless Alleluia"	C. Asbury; Ran Jackson; Ricky Jackson; Johnson	4:25
Total length:			41:45

== Personnel ==
Adapted from AllMusic.

- Cory Asbury — acoustic guitar, vocals
- Baltazar Pezos — executive director
- Hank Bentley — acoustic guitar
- Robby Busick — production manager
- Amanda Cook — background vocals
- Chris Estes — director
- Jason Ingram — background vocals, programming, producing
- Brian Johnson — executive producer
- Toby Johnson — video director
- Bommy Kwon — video editor
- Dwayne Larring — electric guitar, tracking
- Tony Lucido — bass
- Paul Mabury — background vocals, drums, producing, programming, tracking
- Dave McNair — mastering
- Sean Moffitt — mixing
- Taylor Sabo — art direction, design
- Lucas Sankey — photography
- Gabe Scott — acoustic guitar, electric guitar
- Matt Stanfield — piano, programming
- Joel Taylor — executive producer
- Aly Whitworth — video producer
- Bethany Wilford — project manager
- Joe Williams — programming

== Charts ==
=== Weekly charts ===
Chart (2018)	Peak position
Australian Albums (ARIA)	69
New Zealand Heatseeker Albums (RMNZ)	7
Swiss Albums (Schweizer Hitparade)	73
UK Album Downloads (OCC)	43
UK Christian & Gospel Albums (OCC)	1
US Billboard 200	53
US Christian Albums (Billboard)	1
US Independent Albums (Billboard)	4

=== Year-end charts ===
Chart (2018)	Position
US Christian Albums (Billboard)	11
US Independent Albums (Billboard)	38
Chart (2019)	Position
US Christian Albums (Billboard)	28
Chart (2020)	Position
US Christian Albums (Billboard)	56
Chart (2021)	Position
US Christian Albums (Billboard)	73
Chart (2022)	Position
US Christian Albums (Billboard)	98
Chart (2023)	Position
US Christian Albums (Billboard)	73

== Release history ==
Region	Date	Format	Label	Ref.
Various	January 26, 2018	CD; digital download; streaming	Bethel Music	
