= 2019 Billboard Music Awards =

Annual American music awards ceremony

- Date: May 1, 2019
- Location: MGM Grand Garden Arena, Las Vegas, Nevada, United States
- Hosted by: Kelly Clarkson

Highlights
- Most wins: Drake (12)
- Most nominations: Cardi B (21)

Television/radio coverage
- Network: NBC (May 1, 2019); NET. (May 12, 2019)
- Viewership: 8.01 million

The 2019 Billboard Music Awards ceremony was held at the MGM Grand Garden Arena in Las Vegas, Nevada on May 1, 2019. It aired live on NBC and was hosted by Kelly Clarkson for a second year in a row. The list of nominees were announced on April 4, 2019. Mariah Carey received the Icon Award during the show.

== Performers ==
Performer(s)	Song
Taylor Swift; Brendon Urie	"Me!"
Kelly Clarkson	Medley: "Meant to Be" by Bebe Rexha and Florida Georgia Line "Eastside" by Benny Blanco, Halsey, Khalid "Boo'd Up" by Ella Mai "Girls Like You" by Maroon 5 and Cardi B "The Middle" by Zedd, Maren Morris, and Grey "One Kiss" by Calvin Harris and Dua Lipa "I Like It" by Cardi B, Bad Bunny, and J Balvin "Love Lies" by Khalid and Normani "High Hopes" by Panic! at the Disco "Tequila" by Dan + Shay "Material Girl" by Madonna "Touch My Body" by Mariah Carey "Wow" by Post Malone Later in the show: "Broken & Beautiful"
Halsey	"Without Me"
Ciara	"Thinkin Bout You"
Dan + Shay; Tori Kelly	"Speechless"
Jonas Brothers	"Jealous" "Cake by the Ocean" "Sucker"
Khalid	"Talk" "Better"
Ariana Grande	"7 Rings"^{[a]}
Madonna; Maluma	"Medellín"
Lauren Daigle	"You Say"
Mariah Carey	"A No No" "Always Be My Baby" "Emotions" "We Belong Together" "Hero"
Panic! at the Disco	"Hey Look Ma, I Made It"
BTS; Halsey	"Boy with Luv"
Paula Abdul	"Straight Up" "The Way That You Love Me" "Vibeology" "Opposites Attract" "Cold Hearted" "Forever Your Girl"

Notes

- ^{^[a]} Pre-recorded April 27 at Rogers Arena in Vancouver, during the live Sweetener World Tour gig there

== Winners and nominees ==
Winners are listed first and bold.

Top Artist	Top New Artist	Billboard Chart Achievement (fan-voted)
Drake; Ariana Grande; Cardi B; Post Malone; Travis Scott	Juice WRLD; Bazzi; Dua Lipa; Ella Mai; Lil Baby	Ariana Grande; Dan + Shay; Drake; Lady Gaga and Bradley Cooper; Dua Lipa
Top Male Artist	Top Female Artist	Top Streaming Artist
Drake; Ed Sheeran; Post Malone; Travis Scott; XXXTentacion	Ariana Grande; Cardi B; Ella Mai; Halsey; Taylor Swift	Drake; Ariana Grande; Cardi B; Post Malone; XXXTentacion
Top Duo/Group	Top Billboard 200 Artist	Top Radio Songs Artist
BTS; Dan + Shay; Imagine Dragons; Maroon 5; Panic! at the Disco	Drake; Ariana Grande; Post Malone; Travis Scott; XXXTentacion	Drake; Ariana Grande; Cardi B; Post Malone; Maroon 5
Top Billboard 200 Album	Top Hot 100 Artist	Top Social Artist (fan-voted)
Scorpion – Drake; ? – XXXTentacion; Astroworld – Travis Scott; Beerbongs & Bentleys – Post Malone; Invasion of Privacy – Cardi B	Drake; Ariana Grande; Cardi B; Nicki Minaj; Post Malone	BTS; Exo; Got7; Ariana Grande; Louis Tomlinson
Top Hot 100 Song	Top Song Sales Artist	Top Touring Artist
"Girls Like You" – Maroon 5 featuring Cardi B; "Better Now" – Post Malone; "I Like It" – Cardi B, Bad Bunny and J Balvin; "Lucid Dreams" – Juice Wrld; "Sicko Mode" – Travis Scott	Drake; Ariana Grande; Imagine Dragons; Lady Gaga; Post Malone	Ed Sheeran; Taylor Swift; The Carters; Bruno Mars; Justin Timberlake
Top R&B Artist	Top R&B Male Artist	Top R&B Female Artist
Ella Mai; H.E.R.; Khalid; The Weeknd; XXXTentacion	The Weeknd; Khalid; XXXTentacion	Ella Mai; H.E.R.; Queen Naija
Top Rap Artist	Top Rap Male Artist	Top Rap Female Artist
Drake; Cardi B; Juice Wrld; Post Malone; Travis Scott	Drake; Post Malone; Travis Scott	Cardi B; City Girls; Nicki Minaj
Top R&B Tour	Top Rap Tour	Top Rock Tour
The Carters; Bruno Mars; Childish Gambino	The Carters; Travis Scott; Drake	Elton John; U2; The Rolling Stones
Top Country Artist	Top Country Male Artist	Top Country Female Artist
Luke Combs; Kane Brown; Jason Aldean; Florida Georgia Line; Dan + Shay	Luke Combs; Kane Brown; Jason Aldean	Carrie Underwood; Maren Morris; Kacey Musgraves
Top Country Tour	Top Country Duo/Group	Top Rock Artist
Kenny Chesney; Shania Twain; Luke Bryan	Dan + Shay; Florida Georgia Line; Old Dominion	Imagine Dragons; Panic! at the Disco; Queen; Lovelytheband; Twenty One Pilots
Top Dance/Electronic Artist	Top Latin Artist	Top Gospel Artist
The Chainsmokers; Calvin Harris; Kygo; Marshmello; Odesza	Ozuna; J Balvin; Romeo Santos; Anuel AA; Bad Bunny	Tasha Cobbs Leonard; Tori Kelly; Marvin Sapp; Koryn Hawthorne; Kirk Franklin
Top Christian Artist	Top Soundtrack	Top R&B Album
Lauren Daigle; For King & Country; Hillsong Worship; MercyMe; Cory Asbury	The Greatest Showman; Spider-Man: Into the Spider-Verse; Bohemian Rhapsody; A Star Is Born; 13 Reasons Why: Season 2	17 – XXXTentacion; Ella Mai – Ella Mai; My Dear Melancholy – The Weeknd; H.E.R. – H.E.R.; American Teen – Khalid
Top Gospel Album	Top Country Album	Top Christian Album
Hiding Place – Tori Kelly; Snoop Dogg Presents Bible of Love – Snoop Dogg & Various Artists; Gospel Greats – Aretha Franklin; Unstoppable – Koryn Hawthorne; Make Room – Jonathan McReynolds	This One's For You – Luke Combs; Rearview Town – Jason Aldean; Kane Brown – Kane Brown; Dan + Shay – Dan + Shay; Cry Pretty – Carrie Underwood	Look Up Child – Lauren Daigle; Reckless Love – Cory Asbury; Burn the Ships – For King & Country; There Is More – Hillsong Worship; Chain Breaker – Zach Williams
Top Rap Album	Top Rock Album	Top Latin Album
Scorpion – Drake; ? – XXXTentacion; Astroworld – Travis Scott; Beerbongs & Bentleys – Post Malone; Invasion of Privacy – Cardi B	Pray For The Wicked – Panic! at the Disco; Come Tomorrow – Dave Matthews Band; Origins – Imagine Dragons; Delta – Mumford & Sons; Trench – Twenty One Pilots	Aura – Ozuna; Real Hasta la Muerte – Anuel AA; X 100pre – Bad Bunny; Vibras – J Balvin; F.A.M.E. – Maluma
Top Dance/Electronic Album	Top Streaming Song (Audio)	Top Streaming Song (Video)
Sick Boy – The Chainsmokers; What Is Love? – Clean Bandit; 7 – David Guetta; Kids in Love – Kygo; Major Lazer Essentials – Major Lazer	"Sicko Mode" – Travis Scott; "I Like It" – Cardi B, Bad Bunny and J Balvin; "Lucid Dreams" – Juice Wrld; "Better Now" – Post Malone; "SAD!" – XXXTentacion	"In My Feelings" – Drake; "Lucid Dreams" – Juice Wrld; "Girls Like You" – Maroon 5 featuring Cardi B; "Sicko Mode" – Travis Scott; "SAD!" – XXXTentacion
Top Collaboration	Top Radio Song	Top Selling Song
"Girls Like You" – Maroon 5 featuring Cardi B; "I Like It" – Cardi B, Bad Bunny and J Balvin; "Love Lies" – Khalid and Normani; "Psycho" – Post Malone featuring Ty Dolla Sign; "Happier" – Marshmello and Bastille	"Girls Like You" – Maroon 5 featuring Cardi B; "Love Lies" – Khalid and Normani; "Better Now" – Post Malone; "Meant to Be" – Bebe Rexha & Florida Georgia Line; "The Middle" – Zedd, Maren Morris and Grey	"Girls Like You" – Maroon 5 featuring Cardi B; "I Like It" – Cardi B, Bad Bunny and J Balvin; "In My Feelings" – Drake; "Without Me" – Halsey; "Shallow" – Lady Gaga and Bradley Cooper
Top Rap Song	Top Christian Song	Top Gospel Song
"I Like It" – Cardi B, Bad Bunny and J Balvin; "In My Feelings" – Drake; "Lucid Dreams" – Juice Wrld; "Better Now" – Post Malone; "Sicko Mode" – Travis Scott	"You Say" – Lauren Daigle; "Reckless Love" – Cory Asbury; "Joy" – For King & Country; "Who You Say I Am" – Hillsong Worship; "Known" – Tauren Wells	"Won't He Do It" – Koryn Hawthorne; "Your Great Name" – Todd Dulaney; "Never Alone" – Tori Kelly featuring Kirk Franklin; "Forever" – Jason Nelson; "A Great Work" – Brian Courtney Wilson
Top R&B Song	Top Country Song	Top Rock Song
"Boo'd Up" – Ella Mai; "No Brainer" – DJ Khaled feat. Justin Bieber, Chance The Rapper & Quavo; "Trip" – Ella Mai; "Better" – Khalid; "Freaky Friday" – Lil Dicky feat. Chris Brown	"Meant to Be" – Bebe Rexha & Florida Georgia Line; "Heaven" – Kane Brown; "She Got the Best of Me" – Luke Combs; "Speechless" – Dan + Shay; "Tequila" – Dan + Shay	"High Hopes" – Panic! at the Disco; "Sit Next to Me" – Foster the People; "Natural" – Imagine Dragons; "Whatever It Takes" – Imagine Dragons; "Broken" – Lovelytheband
Top Latin Song	Top Dance/Electronic Song	Icon Award
"Te Boté" – Casper Magico, Nio Garcia, Darell, Nicky Jam, Bad Bunny & Ozuna; "Mia" – Bad Bunny featuring Drake; "Dura" – Daddy Yankee; "Taki Taki" – DJ Snake feat. Selena Gomez, Ozuna and Cardi B; "X" – Nicky Jam and J Balvin	"The Middle" – Zedd, Maren Morris and Grey; "Taki Taki" – DJ Snake feat. Selena Gomez, Ozuna and Cardi B; "One Kiss" – Calvin Harris and Dua Lipa; "Happier" – Marshmello and Bastille; "Jackie Chan" – Tiësto and Dzeko feat. Preme and Post Malone	Mariah Carey

== Multiple nominations and awards ==
The following received multiple awards:

Twelve:

- Drake

Six:

- Cardi B

Four:

- Maroon 5

Three:

- Ella Mai
- Luke Combs
- Lauren Daigle
- Ozuna

Two:

- Ariana Grande
- BTS
- The Carters
- The Chainsmokers
- Panic! at the Disco

The following received multiple nominations:

Twenty one:

- Cardi B

Seventeen:

- Drake
- Post Malone

Twelve:

- Travis Scott

Ten:

- XXXTentacion

Nine:

- Ariana Grande

Eight:

- Bad Bunny
- Dan + Shay
- Ella Mai
- J Balvin

Seven:

- Juice Wrld
- Maroon 5

Six:

- Imagine Dragons
- Khalid

Five:

- Kane Brown

Four:

- Florida Georgia Line
- Luke Combs
- Ozuna
- Panic! at the Disco

Three:

- The Carters
- Cory Asbury
- Dua Lipa
- For King & Country
- H.E.R.
- Hillsong Worship
- Jason Aldean
- Koryn Hawthorne
- Lady Gaga
- Lauren Daigle
- Maren Morris
- Marshmello
- Tori Kelly
- The Weeknd

Two:

- Anuel AA
- Bastille
- Bebe Rexha
- Bradley Cooper
- Bruno Mars
- BTS
- Calvin Harris
- Carrie Underwood
- The Chainsmokers
- DJ Snake
- Ed Sheeran
- Grey
- Halsey
- Kirk Franklin
- Kygo
- Lovelytheband
- Normani
- Selena Gomez
- Taylor Swift
- Twenty One Pilots
- Zedd
