= Love Will Have Its Day =

Studio album by Laura Hackett Park
- Released: October 21, 2014
- Genre: CCM, worship
- Length: 52:06
- Label: Forerunner
- Producer: Brown Bannister, Ben Shive

Laura Hackett Park chronology
Laura Hackett (2009)	Love Will Have Its Day (2014)

Love Will Have Its Day is the second album from Laura Hackett Park. Forerunner Music released the project on October 21, 2014. Hackett Park worked with Brown Bannister and Ben Shive in the production of this album.

== Critical reception ==
Professional ratings
Review scores
Source	Rating
365 Days of Inspiring Media	4/5 stars
CCM Magazine	4/5 stars
Christian Review Magazine	4/5 stars
Cross Rhythms	9/10 squares
Louder Than the Music	5/5 stars
New Release Tuesday	4.5/5 stars
Worship Leader	4/5 stars

Specifying in a four star review by CCM Magazine, Andrew Greer recognizes, "A wellkept secret should be well-kept no longer." Kristen Gilles, indicating for Worship Leader in a four star review, realizes, the album "explores a broad range of music for personal reflection and worship." Signaling in a four and a half star review from New Release Tuesday, Kevin Davis responds, "This album soothes, moves and challenges listeners. Love Will Have its Day is a profound listening experience." Tony Cummings, designating the album a nine out of ten, grasps, "So throughout Laura's crystal clear voice and songs which exude personal experience as well as intense devotion to the living God make for a hugely memorable album." Awarding the album four stars at 365 Days of Inspiring Media, Joshua Andre writes, "Laura’s album is so rich lyrically, and deserves a thorough listen." Rating the album five stars by Louder Than the Music, Jono Davies says, "This is a top top album from a top top artist." Christian St. John, awarding the album four stars at Christian Review Magazine, writes, "Laura has a beautiful voice and it shines" on this "excellent release".

== Accolades ==
This album was no. 13 on the Worship Leader's Top 20 Albums of 2014 list.

== Track listing ==
No.	Title	Writer(s)	Length
1.	"Changes Everything"	Jonathan Engle, Laura Hackett Park	1:54
2.	"The Love Inside"	Hackett Park	5:57
3.	"Lift up Your Head"	Hackett Park, Ben Shive	4:20
4.	"Beautiful Heart"	Cassie Campbell, Hackett Park, Adam Sniegowski	3:05
5.	"Song of Destiny"	Hackett Park, Shive	4:45
6.	"He Shall Reign"	Hackett Park, Shive	6:01
7.	"King Jesus"	Campbell, Engle, Hackett Park	3:49
8.	"Anger"	Hackett Park	3:52
9.	"I Feel His Love"	Hackett Park	5:17
10.	"Got Something Going On"	Hackett Park	3:10
11.	"Brilliant Light"	Hackett Park	6:19
12.	"Cover Me"	Hackett Park	3:37
Total length:			52:06

== Charts ==
Chart (2014)	Peak position
US Christian Albums (Billboard)	13
US Heatseekers Albums (Billboard)	11
