= Sparrows (Cory Asbury song) =

2020 single by Cory Asbury

Single by Cory Asbury

from the album To Love a Fool
- Released: September 11, 2020
- Recorded: 2019–2020
- Genre: Worship
- Length: 3:17
- Label: Bethel Music
- Songwriters: Cory Asbury; Ethan Hulse; Andrew Ripp; Jared Anderson
- Producer: Paul Mabury

Cory Asbury singles chronology
"Together (Acoustic Version)" (2020)	"Sparrows" (2020)	"Dear God" (2020)

Music video
- "Sparrows" (Acoustic) on YouTube
- "Sparrows" (Live) on YouTube

"Sparrows" is a song performed by American contemporary worship musician Cory Asbury. On September 11, 2020, the song was released to Christian radio in the United States as the second single from Asbury's third studio album, To Love a Fool. Asbury collaborated with Ethan Hulse, Andrew Ripp, and Jared Anderson in writing the song, and the production of the single was handled by Paul Mabury.

"Sparrows" was a commercial success, having reached No. 6 on the US Hot Christian Songs chart while becoming Asbury's third top ten on the chart.

== Background ==
On June 29, 2020, Asbury unveiled the name and artwork of the then-upcoming album, To Love a Fool, with the release date slated for July 31, 2020. Asbury held an election-style contest for the release of a song from the album, asking fans to vote between "Canyons" and "Sparrows", with the winning song being slated for release on July 10, 2020. The contest was set on July 2. "Sparrows" won the contest and was released as the first promotional single from the album, concurrently launching the album's pre-order.

In an interview with Billboard, Asbury revealed that "Sparrows" will be the second single from the album, following "The Father's House". "Sparrows" was serviced to Christian radio on September 11, 2020, as the second official single from the album. On November 6, 2020, Asbury released the live version of "Sparrows" as part of his album, To Love a Fool – A Rooftop Experience (2020).

== Composition ==
"Sparrows" is composed in the key of A♭ with a tempo of 70 beats per minute and a musical time signature of 4/4.

== Commercial performance ==
"Sparrows" debuted at number 48 on the US Hot Christian Songs chart dated August 1, 2020. The song debuted on the Christian Airplay chart dated September 19, 2020, at number 31, following its release to Christian radio. On the Hot Christian Songs chart dated February 20, 2021, "Sparrows" also became his third top ten entry, having peaked at number 10.

== Music videos ==
Asbury published the audio video of the song on YouTube on July 10, 2020. Asbury then released the acoustic performance video of the song, which was recorded in his loft in downtown Kalamazoo, Michigan, on July 13, 2020. On November 6, 2020, Asbury published the live performance video of the song, which was recorded on a rooftop in Kalamazoo, Michigan.

== Charts ==
=== Weekly charts ===
Weekly chart performance for "Sparrows"
Chart (2020–21)	Peak position
US Hot Christian Songs (Billboard)	6
US Christian Airplay (Billboard)	7
US Christian AC (Billboard)	5

=== Year-end charts ===
Year-end chart performance for "Sparrows"
Chart (2020)	Position
US Christian Songs (Billboard)	96
Chart (2021)	Position
US Christian Songs (Billboard)	31
US Christian Airplay (Billboard)	24
US Christian AC (Billboard)	25

== Release history ==
Region	Date	Format	Label	Ref.
Various	July 10, 2020	Digital download (promotional release); streaming (promotional release)	Bethel Music	
United States	September 11, 2020	Christian hot adult contemporary radio	Bethel Music	
