= To Love a Fool =

2020 studio album by Cory Asbury

Studio album by Cory Asbury
- Released: July 31, 2020
- Recorded: 2019–2020
- Genres: Worship; CCM
- Length: 45:20
- Label: Bethel Music
- Producer: Paul Mabury

Cory Asbury chronology
Reckless Love (2018)	To Love a Fool (2020)	To Love a Fool — A Rooftop Experience (2020)

Singles from To Love a Fool
- 1. "The Father's House" Released: January 24, 2020; 2. "Sparrows" Released: September 11, 2020; 3. "Dear God" Released: October 23, 2020

To Love a Fool is the third solo studio album by American contemporary worship musician Cory Asbury, and his fourth album overall. Bethel Music released the album on July 31, 2020. Paul Mabury handled the production of the album.

The album was supported by the release of "The Father's House" as the lead single. The song peaked at number three on the US Hot Christian Songs chart.

To Love a Fool received critical acclaim from critics, with Asbury being praised for his rawness, vulnerability, and honesty. The album debuted at number four on the US Top Christian Albums chart, earning 4,000 album-equivalent units. The album also debuted at number fifteen on UK Christian & Gospel Albums chart. The album received a nomination for the GMA Dove Award Pop/Contemporary Album of the Year at the 2021 GMA Dove Awards.

== Release and promotion ==
=== Singles ===
The album's lead single, "The Father's House", was released on January 24, 2020. The single version was produced by Ed Cash. The song peaked at number three on the US Hot Christian Songs chart.

"Sparrows" was released to Christian radio in the United States on September 11, 2020, as the second single from the album.

On October 24, 2020, Asbury released "Dear God" digitally as the third single from the album.

=== Promotional singles ===
On June 29, 2020, Asbury unveiled the name and artwork of the then-upcoming album, To Love a Fool, with the release date slated for July 31, 2020. Asbury held an election-style contest for the release of a song from the album, asking fans to vote between "Canyons" and "Sparrows", with the winning song being slated for release on July 10, 2020. The contest was set on July 2. "Sparrows" won the contest and was released as the first promotional single album, concurrently launching the album's pre-order. The song debuted at number 48 on the US Hot Christian Songs chart.

"Canyons" was released as the second and final promotional single on July 18, 2020. The song debuted at number 37 on the Hot Christian Songs chart.

=== Other songs ===
On May 18, 2020, Asbury released the raw audio video of "Dear God" on YouTube, stating that the recording is "the unmixed, untouched, raw voice memo audio from the first time I sang it." He also added that the full song would be released with the album on July 31, 2020.

== Reception ==
=== Critical response ===
Professional ratings
Review scores
Source	Rating
365 Days of Inspiring Media	5/5
CCM Magazine	4/5 stars
Jesus Freak Hideout	3.5/5 stars
JubileeCast	4/5
One Man In The Middle	3.95/5 stars
Today's Christian Entertainment	4.5/5 stars

Jonathan Andre in his 365 Days of Inspiring Media review opined that To Love a Fool is most anticipated Christian music albums in 2020 saying "this new album from Cory didn't disappoint." Andre congratulated Asbury "for such a poignant emotive album." CCM Magazine's Mark Geil gave a favourable review of the album, describing it as "a full-length collection of powerful, honest songs born of a year-long sabbatical in 2019." Geil opined that "this is an excellent sophomore release from a formidable voice in Christian music." Jesus Freak Hideout's Bert Gangl says in his three-point-five star review: "the brightest moments on Fool do manage to elevate it to slightly above-average status, there still aren't enough of them to recommend the album, as a whole, to anybody but the already converted." Timothy Yap of JubileeCast praised the album, saying, "Though Asbury's previous record had that juggernaut hit "Reckless Love," To Love a Fool as a whole is a much stronger effort: it shows a more personal side of Asbury with songs that are given to more creative expressions." In a NewReleaseToday review, Grace Chaves spoke of the album, saying "Each tune is a reminder of how broken we are, and how great God is in light of our brokenness. To Love a Fool is vulnerable and filled with worship." Chaves "It's a beautiful album, with such breathtaking lyrics. This is a record that will make you reflect on who God is, and how incredible it is that he chose to love us." Abby Baracskai-Thigpen, indicating in a four-point-five star review at Today's Christian Entertainment, commended Asbury for "not shying away from the tougher and messier things we go experience, feel, think and do, as well as look at the not so pretty parts of ourselves too." Rob Allwright, reviewing for One Man In The Middle, concluded: "Overall this album has plenty for us to think about. There is some thematic repetition in this album and also a lot that goes back to the previous release, but there is still a lot of fresh concepts to chew over and sing about."

=== Accolades ===
Awards
Year	Organization	Award	Result	Ref
2021	GMA Dove Awards	Pop/Contemporary Album of the Year	Nominated	

== Commercial performance ==
In the United States, To Love a Fool debuted on the Billboard Top Christian Albums chart at number four, having earned 4,000 equivalent album units in the first week of sales. The album is Cory Asbury's second top ten release on the chart, following Reckless Love (2018).

To Love a Fool also became Cory Asbury's second appearance on the OCC's Official Christian & Gospel Albums Chart in the United Kingdom, launching at number fifteen in the week ending August 13, 2020.

== Track listing ==
To Love a Fool
No.	Title	Writer(s)	Length
1.	"Canyons"	Cory Asbury; Ethan Hulse	4:40
2.	"Sparrows"	Jared Anderson; Asbury; Hulse; Andrew Ripp	3:17
3.	"Crashing In"	Asbury; Hulse	3:49
4.	"Nothing More Than You"	Asbury; Benjamin Hastings; Hulse	4:42
5.	"Dear God"	Asbury; Aodhan King	6:07
6.	"The Prodigal Song"	Asbury; Ran Jackson; Ricky Jackson	5:06
7.	"I'm Sorry"	Asbury	4:15
8.	"Faithful Wounds"	Asbury	4:35
9.	"Unraveling"	Asbury	4:39
10.	"The Father's House"	Asbury; Hastings; Hulse	4:05
Total length:			45:20

- Songwriting credits adapted from PraiseCharts.

== Credits ==
Adapted from AllMusic.

- Eric Allen — A&R
- David Angell — violin
- Cory Asbury — primary artist
- Kevin Bate — cello
- Matt Butler — cello
- Taylor Clarke — audio engineer
- Dave Curran — bass guitar
- David Davidson — violin
- Chris Estes — director
- Stephen Hart — art direction, design, photography
- Jenny Hislop — project manager
- Brian Johnson — executive producer
- Adam Lester — electric guitar
- Tony Lucido — bass guitar
- Brett Mabury — string arrangements
- Paul Mabury — background vocals, drums, producer, programming
- Caleb Marmolejo — photography, photography director, video director
- Dave McNair — mastering
- Buckley Miller — string engineer
- Sean Moffitt — mixing
- Tommy Muller — marketing
- Zach Pugh — video editor
- Sari Reist — cello
- Gabe Scott — acoustic guitar, dobro
- Javier Solís — Percussion
- Matt Stanfield — keyboards, piano, programming
- Joel Taylor — executive producer
- Kristin Wilkinson — violin
- Joe Williams — keyboards, programming

== Charts ==
=== Weekly charts ===
Weekly chart performance for To Love a Fool
Chart (2020)	Peak position
UK Christian & Gospel Albums (OCC)	15
US Top Christian Albums (Billboard)	4
US Top Album Sales (Billboard)	92

=== Year-end charts ===
Year-end chart performance for To Love a Fool
Chart (2020)	Position
US Christian Albums (Billboard)	60

Chart (2021)	Position
US Christian Albums (Billboard)	35

== Release history ==
Region	Date	Format	Label	Ref.
Various	July 31, 2020	CD; digital download; streaming	Bethel Music	
