= Jason Upton =

- Born: December 15, 1973 (age 52); Minneapolis, Minnesota
- Genres: Worship, contemporary Christian
- Occupations: Worship leader, singer, songwriter
- Instruments: Vocals, piano, keyboards
- Years active: 2000–present
- Labels: Key of David Ministries, Integrity, Sparrow, Gotee
- Website: jasonupton.com

Jason Upton (born December 15, 1973) is an American contemporary worship music singer, songwriter and recording artist. His musical creations are mostly inspired by folk music.

== Early life ==
Jason Upton was born on December 15, 1973, in Minneapolis and was adopted by a Christian family in March 1974. He has Native American roots since his biological father was a Cherokee.

== Musical career ==
Upton released Key of David in 2000. It was recorded live in Virginia Beach that year and was produced by Upton's own Key of David Ministries. Over half of the album consisted of unrehearsed, spontaneous songs and declarations. Later in 2000, Upton appeared at a National Day of Prayer and Fasting event called "The Call D.C." On August 14, 2001, Upton released his second album, Faith, which was recorded live and released on 40 Records. The title track was an unplanned song which Upton referred to in the liner notes of the album as a "Spirit Song".

In 2002, he released two independent albums, Jacob's Dream and Dying Star, his first to have been recorded in the studio. That same year, he recorded "You Are the One" on the collaborative Keith Green tribute album Your Love Broke Through: The Worship Songs of Keith Green. In 2003, Upton released the independently recorded live album, Remember. The final track on Remember, Fly, has reached and touched many listeners due to the Angel that was recorded singing alongside Jason. Also that year, Upton led worship at the Onething Conference. Upton released Trusting the Angels in December 2004.

Great River Road was released through Gotee Records in April 2005, and contained five songs from his independent releases and four new compositions and the song recorded for the earlier Keith Green tribute. This album further included a CD-ROM feature of Upton explaining his inspirations for and reasons behind the songs on the album.

Upton's fourth live album, sixth independent album, and eighth overall album, Open Up the Earth was released in late October 2005.

Upton's tenth album, Beautiful People, was released in 2007. It contained piano songs mixing contemplative pop and epic anthems, and includes "Never Alone Martin", which was inspired by a religious experience of Martin Luther King Jr., who had assured that, at the beginning of the Montgomery bus boycott, he started to receive threatening calls, and once, he prayed to God at midnight, and afterwards, heard the voice of Jesus telling him He would never leave him alone.

== Events and tours ==
Upton regularly tours leading worship in churches and at conferences, including Onething. He has rarely appeared on television, although he has appeared at least twice on The 700 Club.

== Discography ==
- Key of David (2000), Key of David Ministries
- Faith (2001), 40Records
- Jacob's Dream - EP (2002), Key of David Ministries
- You Are the One (2002, Single), Sparrow Records
- Dying Star (2002), Key of David Ministries
- Remember (2003), Key of David Ministries
- Trusting the Angels (2004), Key of David Ministries
- Great River Road (2005), Gotee Records
- Open Up the Earth (2005), Key of David Ministries
- Between Earth and Sky (2007), Key of David Ministries
- Beautiful People (2007), Integrity Music
- 1200 Feet Below Sea Level (2008), Key of David Ministries
- On the Rim of the Visible World (2009), Key of David Ministries
- Family Music (2010), Key of David Ministries
- Live From Dublin - Song, Stories And A Train (2010)
- Glimpse (2012), Key of David Ministries
- Sunday Morning: Live in Winston Salem (2013), Jason Upton and Key of David Ministries
- A Table Full of Strangers Vol 1 (2015), Jason Upton
- A Table Full of Strangers Vol 2 (2018), Jason Upton
- God Finds Us (2020), Jason Upton

== Awards ==
In 2007, his album Between Earth and Sky was featured among CBN's best Christian contemporary albums of 2007.

== Popular culture ==
- Jason appeared in the documentary film Justice Waiting which also featured International House of Prayer-KC, Rick Joyner, and Lou Engle.
