= Mosaic MSC =

American contemporary worship music band

- Origin: Los Angeles, California, US
- Genres: Contemporary worship; CCM; Christian rock; CEDM
- Years active: 2014–present
- Labels: Provident Label Group; Capitol Christian Music Group
- Members: Mariah McManus (Goss); Jake Clifford Goss; Andres Figueroa; Brooke Figueroa; Carlos Pimentel; Colin Dennard; Robert Aholoka; Aaron Weits
- Past members: Chris Franz; Matthew Grabe; Kameron Waters; James David; Lucas Taffo; Brian Chandler; Ryan Gilmore
- Website: Official website

Mosaic MSC is a contemporary worship music band from Mosaic Church in Los Angeles, California. The band is led by Worship Pastor Mariah McManus. The band have released three live albums and three extended plays.

== History ==
Mosaic MSC recorded its first worship album, MSC (Live from LA) on May 24, 2014, at the historic Wiltern Theater. After it was released in 2015, it peaked at number 21 on the Christian Albums chart. Mosaic MSC has several charting singles. The song "Nvr Stp" peaked at number 49 on the Billboard Hot Christian Songs in 2015 and their song "Tremble" peaked at number 19 on the chart in March 2018.

Their second album Glory & Wonder peaked at number 16 in 2016.

== Discography ==
=== Studio albums ===
List of studio albums
Title	Album details
This Is How I Thank the Lord	Released: April 8, 2022; Label: Capitol Christian Music Group; Format: Digital download, streaming

=== Live albums ===
List of live albums, with selected chart positions
Title	Album details	Peak chart positions	
Title	Album details	US Christ.	US Heat.
MSC (Live from LA)	Released: April 21, 2015; Label: Mosaic MSC; Format: CD, digital download, streaming	21	10
Glory & Wonder	Released: September 16, 2016; Label: Provident Label Group; Format: CD, digital download, streaming	16	11
Human	Released: May 15, 2020; Label: Capitol Christian Music Group; Format: CD, digital download, streaming	45	—
Ser Humano	Released: May 28, 2021; Label: Capitol Christian Music Group; Format: CD, digital download, streaming	—	—
"—" denotes a recording that did not chart.

=== Extended plays ===
List of EPs, with selected chart positions
Title	EP details	Peak chart positions	
Title	EP details	US Christ.	US Heat.
Unknown	Released: September 29, 2017; Label: Provident Label Group; Format: CD, digital download, streaming	—	—
Tiembla	First Spanish-language EP; Released: November 24, 2017; Label: Provident Label Group; Format: CD, digital download, streaming	—	—
Heaven	Released: September 14, 2018; Label: Provident Label Group; Format: CD, digital download, streaming	32	21
December	Released: December 1, 2021; Label: Capitol Christian Music Group; Format: Digital download, streaming	—	—
"—" denotes a recording that did not chart.

=== Singles ===
Title	Year	Peak positions				Certifications	Album
Title	Year	US Christ. Songs	US Christ. Airplay	US Christ. Digital	US Christ. Streaming	Certifications	Album
"Nvr Stp"	2015	49	—	—	—		MSC (Live in LA)
"Glory & Wonder"	2016	—	—	—	—		Glory & Wonder
"Across the Universe"	2016	—	—	—	—		Glory & Wonder
"Heartbeat"	2016	—	36	—	—		Glory & Wonder
"Splendor of the Son"	2016	—	—	—	—		non-album single
"Tremble"	2017	19	20	11	23	RIAA: Platinum; RMNZ: Gold	Glory & Wonder
"Miracle"	2018	—	—	—	—		non-album single
"Maker of the Heavens"	2018	—	—	—	—		Heaven (EP)
"Never Let Me Down"	2018	—	—	—	—		Heaven (EP)
"Eyes on You"	2019	—	—	—	—		Heaven (EP)
"Fountain (I Am Good)"	2020	—	—	—	—		Human
"Nunca Me Fallas" (with Marcos Witt)	2021	—	—	—	—		Ser Humano
"Matter"	2021	—	—	—	—		Where Would I Be Without You? (single)
"Rescue"	2021	—	—	—	—		Where Would I Be Without You? (single)
"This Is How I Thank the Lord"	2022	49	—	—	—		This Is How I Thank the Lord
"—" denotes a recording that did not chart.

== Awards ==
=== GMA Dove Awards ===
Year	Nominee / work	Award	Result
2018	"Tremble"	Worship Song of the Year	Nominated
2018	Mosaic MSC	New Artist of the Year	Nominated
2018	"Tremble"	Worship Recorded Song of the Year	Nominated
2022	"Mi Salvador"	Spanish Language Recorded Song of the Year	Nominated
