= Celebration (Forrest Frank song) =

Single by Forrest Frank

from the album Child of God II
- Released: April 18, 2025
- Length: 2:41
- Label: River House Records; 10K Projects
- Songwriter: Forrest Frank
- Producer: Forrest Frank

Forrest Frank singles chronology
"No L's" (2025)	"Celebration" (2025)	"God's Got My Back" (2025)

Music video
- Celebration on YouTube

"Celebration" is an Easter-themed song by Forrest Frank, an American hip-hop and lo-fi singer and musician. The song was released on April 18, 2025, through River House Records and 10K Projects.

== Background ==
"Celebration" features two previously released singles, the first being "Your Way's Better", which was released on October 25, 2024, and was featured on the deluxe edition of Frank's album Child of God. The second single to be released was "No L's" on April 11, 2025. "Celebration" was released the next week, on April 18, 2025.

In 2025, "Your Way's Better" went viral on TikTok, reaching No. 41 on the Billboard TikTok Top 50 chart, and it was featured in over 250,000 clips on TikTok. The song's break in popularity is credited to a dance derived from the song.

== Writing and production ==
"Celebration" was written and produced by Forrest Frank, while "No L's" was by Frank, Noah Hayden, and Pera Krstajić. "Your Way's Better" was written by Frank and Krstajić, with both musicians producing "No L's" and "Your Way's Better". The song has lyrics with an Easter theme.

== Commercial performance ==
"Celebration" debuted at No. 13 on the Billboard Hot Christian Songs. That week, it also hit No. 9 on the Christian Digital Song Sales and No. 22 on the Christian Streaming Songs. On November 15, 2025, the song re-entered the Christian Digital Song Sales at No. 3.

== Track listing ==
No.	Title	Writer(s)	Producer(s)	Length
1.	"Celebration"	Forrest Frank	Forrest Frank	2:41
2.	"No L's"	Frank; Noah Hayden; Pera Krstajić	Frank; Krstajić	2:27
3.	"Your Way's Better"	Frank; Krstajić	Frank; Krstajić	3:18
Total length:				8:27

== Credits ==
Adapted from Tidal.

- Amanda Bradshaw – choir
- Forrest Frank – producer, writer
- Grace Pehrman – choir
- Ilija Mihailovic – choir
- Jacob Morris – mastering, mixer
- Noah Hayden – writer
- Pera Krstajić – producer, writer
- Ray Boukris – engineer
- Tyler Christian – choir

== Charts ==
=== Weekly ===
Weekly chart performance for "Celebration"
Chart (2025)	Peak position
NZ Most Added (RadioScope)	23
US Hot Christian Songs (Billboard)	13

=== Year-end ===
Year-end chart performance for "Celebration"
Chart (2025)	Position
US Hot Christian Songs (Billboard)	29

== Release history ==
Release history for "Celebration"
Region	Version	Date	Format	Label	Ref.
Various	Single	April 18, 2025	Digital download; streaming	River House Records; 10K Projects	
Various	Album	May 9, 2025	CD; LP; digital download; streaming	River House Records; 10K Projects	
