= Cory Asbury =

American Christian musician and pastor (born 1985)

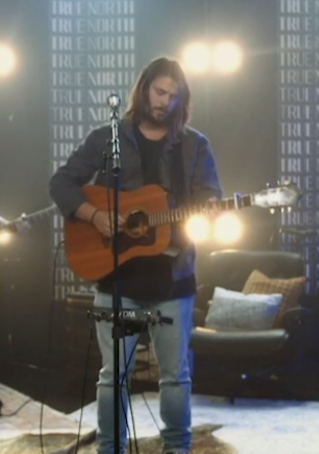
- Asbury performing in 2020

Background information
- Born: Cory Hunter Asbury; October 15, 1985 (age 41); Fort Lauderdale, Florida, U.S.
- Origin: Kansas City, Missouri, U.S.
- Genres: Praise & worship; contemporary Christian music
- Occupations: Musician; songwriter; worship pastor
- Instruments: Vocals; guitar; flute
- Years active: 2007–present
- Labels: Forerunner Music; Bethel Music
- Formerly of: Forerunner Music; Onething Live; Desperation Band; New Life Worship; Bethel Music
- Website: Official website

Cory Hunter Asbury (born October 15, 1985) is an American Christian musician, worship pastor, songwriter, and former member of the Bethel Music collective.

Starting as an intern with the International House of Prayer in Kansas City, Missouri, in 2005, Asbury's career as a musician grew as he collaborated with Matt Gilman leading to the release of Holy in 2008, followed by his first solo album, Let Me See Your Eyes, in 2009 by Forerunner Music, and numerous appearances on IHOPKC albums, with songs such as "Where I Belong", "Shekinah", "All Is for Your Glory" and "Holy Ghost Party". In June 2012, Asbury moved to Colorado Springs, Colorado, to join New Life Church where he began as an associate worship pastor, becoming a member of its ensembles, Desperation Band and New Life Worship.

After signing with Bethel Music in 2015, Asbury made his first appearance with the Collective on Have It All (2016). He became more known with the release of "Reckless Love" in late 2017, a hit single that preceded his breakthrough second full-length album, also titled Reckless Love, in early 2018 which was a commercially successful release, having charted in the United States and internationally. "Reckless Love" was nominated for Best Contemporary Christian Music Performance/Song in the 2019 Grammy Awards. His third studio album, To Love a Fool, was released on July 31, 2020, which featured the singles, "The Father's House", "Sparrows", and "Dear God".

== Early life ==
Cory Asbury was born on October 15, 1985. Music affected him profoundly in his childhood, and he developed his songwriting ability growing up in western North Carolina. Asbury began leading worship at his local church when he was seventeen years old. After Asbury finished high school at Franklin High School in Franklin, North Carolina in 2004, he considered studying at UNC Chapel Hill, but his friends who graduated from the Onething internship with International House of Prayer (IHOPKC) in Kansas City persuaded Asbury to attend IHOPKC instead, so Asbury began his internship at IHOPKC on January 1, 2005, where he started his musical career.

== Music and ministry career ==
=== 2005–2012: Holy, Let Me See Your Eyes and IHOPKC releases ===
Asbury began his career during his seven-year stay in Kansas City with the International House of Prayer, starting with the Onething internship program. He made his first appearance on an IHOPKC compilation titled Immersed, released in December 2007, alongside several artists including Misty Edwards and David Brymer. Forerunner Music then released Holy, a collaboration by Asbury with Matt Gilman, on July 10, 2008. The album consists of twelve tracks with Asbury and Gilman performing six each.

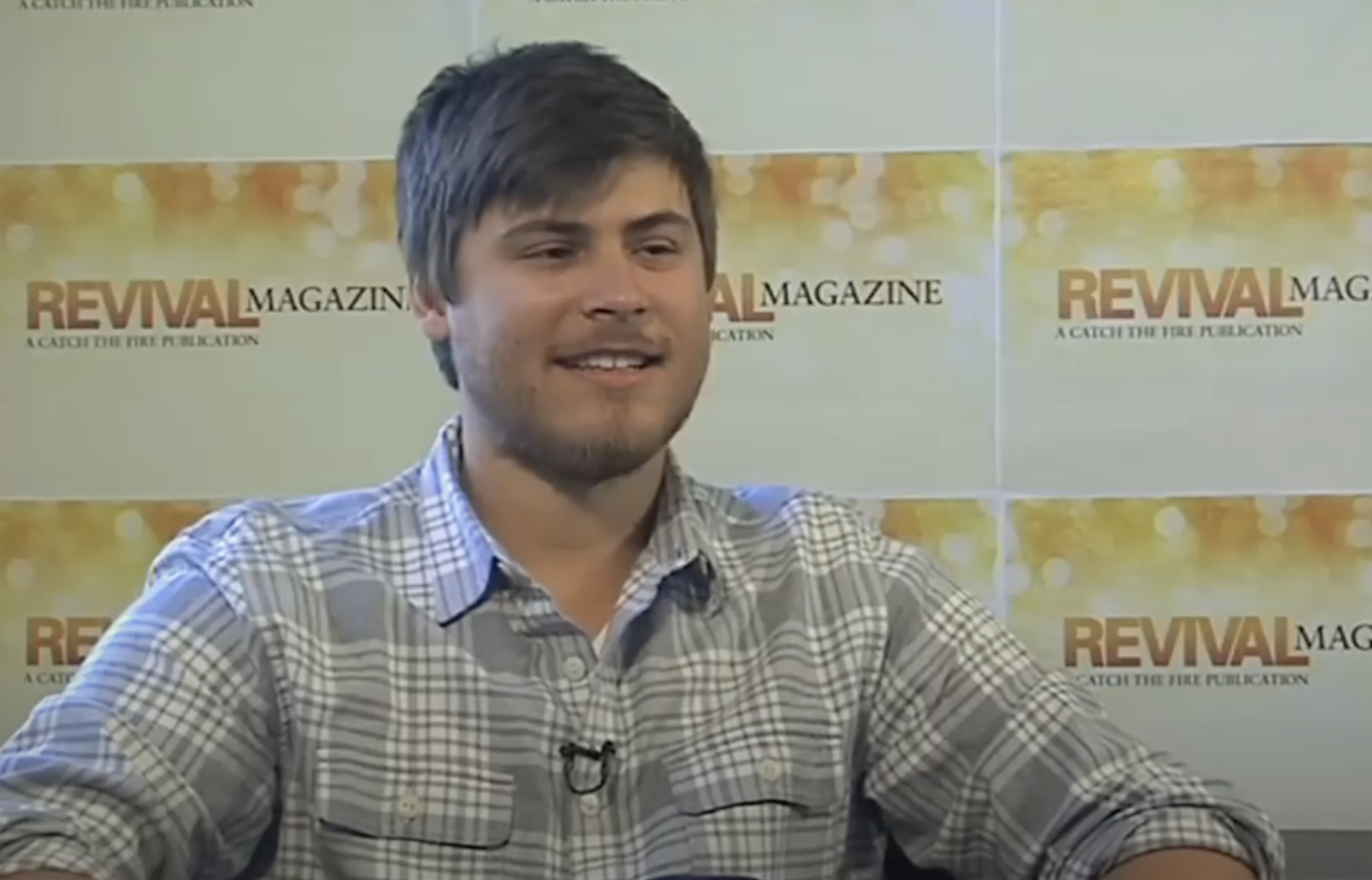
Asbury in 2012

On September 1, 2009, Asbury released his first solo album with Forerunner Music, called Let Me See Your Eyes which included appearances by Jaye Thomas, Edwin Botero, and Nathan Prior. Produced by Seth Yates, Let Me See Your Eyes is an indie pop collection which also incorporates various musical styles including soul, rap and electro. The song "My Beloved", which featured Jaye Thomas, had been released as Asbury's first single from the album in July 2009.

In 2010, Asbury was featured on two IHOPKC albums, Where I Belong by Onething Live and Joy by Forerunner Music, alongside Jaye Thomas and Laura Hackett Park, on both releases. The song "Shekinah", which Asbury performed live with Jaye Thomas and was released as a part of Joy in November, became their first Billboard chart entry, as it peaked at No. 11 on the Gospel Digital Song Sales chart. Released in 2011, Asbury appeared on Before His Eyes by Onething Live, performing "Reason to Dance".

On July 24, 2012, Onething Live released its third live album, Magnificent Obsession, with Asbury featuring on "All Is for Your Glory" and "Never Gonna Leave Me Dry". This album was Onething Live's breakthrough release, with the album making its debut on Billboard's Christian Albums chart at No. 17, and on Heatseekers Albums chart at No 10, credited as IHOPKC Worship.

=== 2012–2016: New Life Church, Bethel Music signing and Radiant Church ===
After spending seven years at the International House of Prayer, Asbury and his family moved to Colorado Springs, Colorado to join New Life Church where he assumed the role of associate worship pastor on June 1, 2012. He led worship on Sunday morning and the Sunday night services as well as the Desperation Student Ministries on Wednesdays. On August 13, 2013, New Life Worship released Strong God, an album recorded live at New Life Church through Integrity Music, with Asbury singing "All to Him" and "Ascribe". Strong God peaked at No. 6 on Billboard's Christian Albums chart, and at No. 165 on the Billboard 200. Asbury also co-wrote "Fun" with Jon Egan and Jason Ingram for Desperation Band's live album, Banner (2014).

In May 2015, Asbury was signed by Bethel Music and became a part of its Artist Collective. On March 11, 2016, Bethel Music released its eighth live album, Have It All, with Asbury singing on the song "Son of God", his first feature for Bethel. Have It All started at No. 2 on the Billboard Christian Albums Chart in its opening week with 25,000 copies sold, peaking at No. 12 on the Billboard 200. He has toured with Bethel Music and has also led worship at the Heaven Come Conference, an annual Bethel Music event launched in 2016. During his tenure there, he led worship during certain services organized at Bethel Church, the home base of Bethel Music in Redding, California.

In December 2016, Asbury moved to Kalamazoo, Michigan, where he began serving as a worship pastor at Radiant Church.

=== 2017–2020: Reckless Love ===
On October 27, 2017, Asbury released his second single, "Reckless Love", in the lead up to the issue of his second solo album. As the song grew in popularity and achieved commercial success with radio airplay weeks before its release date, his third album of the same name, Reckless Love was released on January 26, 2018, by Bethel Music. The album debuted at No. 1 on Billboard's Christian Albums chart with 11,000 equivalent album units sold in its first week, while reaching No. 53 on the all-encompassing Billboard 200 chart for the best-selling releases in the United States. The title track broke into the top ten of Hot Christian Songs as well, reaching No. 7 after massive gains in streaming and radio airplay. Asbury also peaked at No. 3 on Billboard's Emerging Artists chart. Reckless Love also broke through internationally as it topped the Official Christian & Gospel Albums Chart in the United Kingdom, and peaked at No. 69 and 73 on the Australian ARIA Albums chart and the Schweizer Hitparade of Switzerland respectively. The song went on to top several Christian radio charts. It reached No. 1 on the Christian Songs chart, staying there for eighteen weeks. The song also peaked at No. 3 on the Bubbling Under Hot 100 chart. It was nominated for the 2019 Grammy Award for Best Contemporary Christian Music Performance/Song.

In January 2020, Cory Asbury released a new version of "Reckless Love" which featured Tori Kelly, and a devotional book titled Reckless Love: A 40-Day Journey Into the Overwhelming, Never-Ending Love of God.

=== 2020–present: To Love a Fool ===
On January 24, 2020, "The Father's House" was released as the lead single for his third solo album, To Love a Fool. On the Hot Christian Songs chart, the song debuted at No. 16, peaking at No. 3 on the chart. Asbury released "Christ Be Magnified" as a standalone single on February 28, 2020. On April 4, 2020, Asbury and Bethel Music released "Egypt" as third single from Bethel Music's album, Revival's in the Air (2020). The song peaked at No. 36 on the Hot Christian Songs chart. To Love a Fool was released on July 31, 2020. To Love a Fool debuted at number four on the Billboard Top Christian Albums chart. On September 11, 2020, "Sparrows" was released to Christian radio in the United States as the second single from To Love a Fool. "Sparrows" peaked at number 6 on Hot Christian Songs chart. Asbury released "Dear God" as the third single from To Love a Fool, on October 23, 2020. "Dear God" debuted at number 34 on the Hot Christian Songs chart.

On November 6, 2020, Asbury released his first live album, To Love a Fool – A Rooftop Experience which contains live versions of the songs that initially appeared on To Love a Fool studio recording. The album debuted at number 20 on the Top Christian Albums Chart.

Asbury received two nominations for the 2021 GMA Dove Awards, being nominated for Song of the Year for "The Father's House" and Pop/Contemporary Album of the Year for To Love a Fool. In August 2021, Asbury announced that he would be headlining the Songs and Stories tour in the United States, alongside Benjamin Hastings of Hillsong United.

== Personal life ==
Asbury married his wife, Anna in 2007; they have 5 children. They currently reside on a 7-acre farm outside of Nashville, Tennessee.

== Discography ==
Studio albums

- Let Me See Your Eyes (2009)
- Reckless Love (2018)
- To Love a Fool (2020)
- Pioneer (2023)
- Cover to Cover (2025)
- Outsing The Angels (2026)

Collaborative albums

- Holy with Matt Gilman (2008)

Live albums

- To Love a Fool – A Rooftop Experience (2020)

== Bibliography ==
- — (January 7, 2020). Reckless Love: A 40-Day Journey Into the Overwhelming, Never-Ending Love of God. Charisma House. ISBN 978-1629997575.

== Tours ==
=== Headlining ===
- Songs and Stories Tour (2021)
- The Pioneer Tour (2023)

=== As featured act ===
- Forrest Frank - Jesus Generation Tour (with Tori Kelly and The Figs, 2026)

== Awards ==
=== Billboard Music Awards ===
| Year | Nominee / work | Award | Result |
|---|---|---|---|
| 2019 | Cory Asbury | Top Christian Artist | Nominated |
| 2019 | Reckless Love | Top Christian Album | Nominated |
| 2019 | "Reckless Love" | Top Christian Song | Nominated |

=== GMA Dove Awards ===
| Year | Nominee / work | Award | Result |
|---|---|---|---|
| 2018 | "Reckless Love" | Song of the Year | Won |
| 2018 | "Reckless Love" | Worship Song of the Year | Won |
| 2018 | "Reckless Love" | Worship Recorded Song of the Year | Nominated |
| 2018 | Cory Asbury | New Artist of the Year | Nominated |
| 2018 | Reckless Love | Worship Album of the Year | Won |
| 2021 | "The Father's House" | Song of the Year | Nominated |
| 2021 | To Love a Fool | Pop/Contemporary Album of the Year | Nominated |

=== Grammy Awards ===
| Year | Nominee/work | Award | Result |
|---|---|---|---|
| 2019 | "Reckless Love" | Best Contemporary Christian Music Performance/Song | Nominated |

== Awards and nominations ==
| Year | Nominee/work | Award | Result |
|---|---|---|---|
| 2025 | "Good for Nothing" | Country / Roots Song of the Year | Nominated |

== See also ==
- List of Christian worship music artists
