= No L's =

Single by Forrest Frank

from the album Child of God II
- Released: April 11, 2025
- Length: 5:35
- Label: River House; 10K Projects
- Songwriters: Forrest Frank; Noah Hayden; Pera Krstajić
- Producers: Forrest Frank; Pera Krstajić

Forrest Frank singles chronology
"Heaven On My Mind" (2025)	"No L's" (2025)	"Celebration" (2025)

"No L's" is a song by Forrest Frank, an American hip-hop and lo-fi singer and musician. The song was released on April 11, 2025, through River House Records and 10K Projects. The single features the viral TikTok song, "Your Way's Better". On April 17, 2025, both songs were featured on the single "Celebration".

== Background ==
"No L's" used a sample of over 10,000 people, recorded in Grand Rapids, Michigan, at the Van Andel Arena on March 31, 2025 as part of Frank's live performances on the Child of God Tour.

== Commercial performance ==
"No L's" peaked at No. 12 on the Hot Christian Songs chart and No. 12 on the Christian Digital Song Sales chart.

== Track listing ==
No.	Title	Writer(s)	Producer(s)	Length
1.	"No L's"	Forrest Frank; Noah Hayden; Pera Krstajić	Forrest Frank; Pera Krstajić	2:27
2.	"Your Way's Better"	Forrest Frank; Pera Krstajić	Forrest Frank; Pera Krstajić	3:18
Total length:				5:35

== Credits ==
Adapted from Tidal.

- Amanda Bradshaw – backing vocals
- Forrest Frank – producer, lead vocalist, writer
- Grace Pehrman – backing vocals
- Jacob Morris – mastering, mixing
- Noah Hayden – writer
- Pera Krstajić – producer, writer
- Ray Boukris – engineer

== Charts ==
=== Weekly ===
Weekly chart performance for "No L's"
Chart (2025–2026)	Peak position
US Christian Hip Hop Airplay (GMA)	11
US Hot Christian Songs (Billboard)	12

=== Year-end ===
Year-end chart performance for "No L's"
Chart (2025)	Position
US Hot Christian Songs (Billboard)	41

== Release history ==
Release history for "No L's"
Region	Version	Date	Format	Label	Ref.
Various	Single	April 11, 2025	Digital download; streaming	River House Records; 10K Projects	
Various	Child of God II	May 9, 2025	CD; LP; digital download; streaming	River House Records; 10K Projects	
Various	Child of God II (Back to Back) Deluxe	September 5, 2025	CD; LP; digital download; streaming	River House Records; 10K Projects	
