= God's Got My Back =

Single by Forrest Frank

from the album Child of God II (Back to Back) Deluxe
- Released: July 25, 2025
- Genre: Contemporary Christian; pop; rock
- Length: 2:38
- Label: River House Records; 10K Projects
- Songwriter: Forrest Frank
- Producer: Forrest Frank

Forrest Frank singles chronology
"Celebration" (2025)	"God's Got My Back" (2025)	"Lemonade" (2025)

Music video
- "God's Got My Back" on YouTube

"God's Got My Back" is a song by American Christian pop and hip-hop musician Forrest Frank, released on July 25, 2025, via River House Records and 10K Projects.

== Background ==
On July 19, 2025, Frank announced that, while in a skateboarding accident, and had suffered from multiple back fractures. After noticing a comment on social media asking how he would make music with the injury, he was inspired to record and produce a song themed around the back fracture, while on his hospital bed. Frank teased the song online, and within three hours, it received several million views, later achieving over 42 million views. Seeing the song's success, he released it on July 25, 2025.

== Writing and production ==
Frank wrote, produced, programmed, and sang vocals for "God's Got My Back", while Jacob "Biz" Morris mastered and mixed the song.

The song demonstrates the genres of contemporary Christian, pop, and rock.

== Reception ==
Christian rapper Lecrae took notice of the song, saying, "That joint sounds dope". Colton Dixon labelled it as the "Epitome of no excuses".

Frank teased the song to various social media platforms, and within three hours, it received several million views. It garnered thirty million views within three days.

== Commercial performance ==
"God's Got My Back" was recognized as Atlantic Music Group's top streaming debut, receiving two million worldwide streams in a week.

The song debuted at No. 5 on the Billboard Hot Christian Songs, supported by entries of No. 1 on the Christian Digital Song Sales and No. 6 on the Christian Streaming Songs. That week, the song also charted at No. 31 on the RMNZ Hot Singles and No. 16 on the Digital Song Sales.

== Personnel ==
Credits adapted from Tidal Music.

- Forrest Frank – producer, programmer, vocals, writer
- Jacob "Biz" Morris – masterer, mixer

== Charts ==
=== Weekly ===
Weekly chart performance for "God's Got My Back"
Chart (2025)	Peak position
New Zealand Hot Singles (RMNZ)	31
US Christian Songs (Billboard)	5
US Digital Song Sales (Billboard)	16

=== Year-end ===
Year-end chart performance for "Can't Steal My Joy"
Chart (2025)	Position
US Hot Christian Songs (Billboard)	39

== Release history ==
Release history for "God's Got My Back"
Region	Release	Date	Format	Label	Ref.
Various	"God's Got My Back"	July 25, 2025	Digital download; streaming	River House Records; 10K Projects	
Various	Child of God II (Back to Back) Deluxe	September 5, 2025	CD; LP; digital download; streaming	River House Records; 10K Projects	
