= Banner (album) =

Live album by Desperation Band
- Released: September 30, 2014
- Genres: Worship, CCM
- Length: 69:04
- Label: Integrity
- Producers: Jon Egan, Michael Rossback

Banner is the final live album by Desperation Band, released by Integrity Music on September 30, 2014. The album was produced by Jon Egan and Michael Rossback.

== Critical reception ==
Professional ratings
Review scores
Source	Rating
365 Days of Inspiring Media	4/5 stars
CCM Magazine	4/5 stars
Cross Rhythms	8/10 squares
New Release Today	3.5/5 stars
Worship Leader	4.5/5 stars

Awarding the album four stars at CCM Magazine, Grace Aspinwall writes, "With its refreshing, clean and clear sound, Banner succeeds in all aspects: vocals, musicality and arrangements." Barry Westman, giving the album four and a half star from Worship Leader, states, "Banner, an album of epic proportions". Indicating in a three and a half star review for New Release Today, Sarah Fine says, "What Banner lacks in musical originality, it more than makes up for in spiritual substance." Matt McChlery, rating the album an eight out of ten at Cross Rhythms, describes, "This is a great album that contains numerous singable songs". Signaling in a four star review from 365 Days of Inspiring Media, Joshua Andre responds, "With worship ballads and pop radio tunes alike, Banner is a smorgasbord of a worship leader's dream of diversity".

== Awards and accolades ==
This album was No. 18 on the Worship Leader's Top 20 Albums of 2014 list.

== Track listing ==
No.	Title	Writer(s)	Length
1.	"Future" (featuring Jon Egan)	Jon Egan, Jason Ingram	5:11
2.	"Banner" (featuring Jonathan Moos)	Egan, Jared Henderson, Jonathan Moos	4:47
3.	"On the Throne" (featuring Kari Jobe)	Egan, Ingram, Kari Jobe	8:05
4.	"Make a Way" (featuring Jon Egan)	Egan, Ingram	5:54
5.	"We Are Yours" (featuring Nico Perez)	Garret Chenoweth, Jared Gibson, Nico Perez	6:05
6.	"Break Open" (featuring Jon Egan)	Egan	6:30
7.	"Closer to Your Heart" (featuring Bri Giles)	Paul Baloche, Egan, Michael Rossback	5:02
8.	"Fall into You" (featuring Jon Egan)	Caleb Culver, Egan	5:54
9.	"No One Else" (featuring Gina Milne and Nico Perez)	KK Brink, Chenoweth, Perez	4:02
10.	"With All My Heart" (featuring Jonathan Moos)	Egan	5:52
11.	"Multiply" (featuring Gina Milne)	Egan	7:35
12.	"Fun" (featuring Jon Egan)	Cory Asbury, Egan, Ingram, Jonathan Smith	4:07
Total length:			69:04

== Chart performance ==
Chart (2014)	Peak position
US Billboard 200	154
US Top Christian Albums (Billboard)	9
