= Dear God (Cory Asbury song) =

2020 song by Cory Asbury

Single by Cory Asbury

from the album To Love a Fool
- Released: October 23, 2020
- Recorded: 2019–2020
- Genre: Contemporary worship music
- Length: 3:37
- Label: Bethel Music
- Songwriters: Cory Asbury; Aodhan King
- Producer: Paul Mabury

Cory Asbury singles chronology
"Sparrows" (2020)	"Dear God" (2020)	"Repentance (Reimagined)" (2021)

Music videos
- "Dear God" (Acoustic) on YouTube
- "Dear God" (Live) on YouTube
- "Dear God" (Lyrics) on YouTube

"Dear God" is a song performed by American contemporary worship musician Cory Asbury, which was released as the third single to Asbury's third studio album, To Love a Fool, on October 23, 2020. Asbury collaborated with Aodhan King of Hillsong Young & Free in writing the song, and the production of the single was handled by Paul Mabury.

== Background ==
On April 14, 2020, Cory Asbury released a teaser clip of the third verse of "Dear God". On May 18, 2020, Asbury premiered the raw audio version of the song on YouTube, calling it "one of the most honest and vulnerable songs" he has written to date, describing the recording as "It's laid out as a raw prayer to God. This recording is the unmixed, untouched, raw voice memo audio from the first time I sang it." On October 23, 2020, Asbury released the original acoustic version of the song in response to demand from the fans, bundled with a new rendition featuring his wife Anna Asbury, as a single.

On November 6, 2020, Asbury released the live version of "Dear God" as part of his album, To Love a Fool – A Rooftop Experience (2020).

== Composition ==
"Dear God" is composed in the key of E♭ major, with a tempo of 77 beats per minute and a musical time signature of 4/4.

== Commercial performance ==
"Dear God" debuted at No. 34 on the US Hot Christian Songs chart dated November 7, 2020.

== Music videos ==
The raw audio video of "Dear God" performed by Cory Asbury was released on YouTube on May 18, 2020. The lyric music video of the song's album version was published by Asbury on YouTube on July 31, 2020. Asbury then released an acoustic performance video of the song being performed by himself featuring Anna Asbury via Apple Music on October 23, 2020, the video was subsequently uploaded to YouTube a day later. On November 6, 2020, Asbury published the live performance video of the song, which was recorded on a rooftop in Kalamazoo, Michigan.

== Track listing ==
"Dear God"
No.	Title	Length
1.	"Dear God" (Acoustic)	3:37
2.	"Dear God" (Acoustic; featuring Anna Asbury)	3:37

Dear God (Deluxe) — Apple Music exclusive
No.	Title	Length
3.	"Dear God" (Acoustic Music Video; featuring Anna Asbury)	3:36

== Charts ==
Chart performance for "Dear God"
Chart (2020)	Peak position
US Hot Christian Songs (Billboard)	34

== Release history ==
Region	Date	Version	Format	Label	Ref.
Various	October 23, 2020	Standard	Digital download; streaming	Bethel Music	
Various	October 23, 2020	Apple Music deluxe bundle	Digital download; streaming	Bethel Music	
