= To Love a Fool – A Rooftop Experience =

Live album by Cory Asbury
- Released: November 6, 2020
- Recorded: August 20, 2020
- Venue: A rooftop in Kalamazoo, Michigan
- Genre: Worship; CCM
- Length: 59:05
- Label: Bethel Music
- Producer: Paul Mabury; David Whitworth

Cory Asbury chronology
| To Love a Fool (2020) | To Love a Fool – A Rooftop Experience (2020) |

To Love a Fool – A Rooftop Experience is the first live album by American contemporary worship musician Cory Asbury, and his fifth album overall. Bethel Music released the album on November 6, 2020. The album contains live renditions of songs originally released on To Love a Fool (2020). The album was produced by Paul Mabury and David Whitworth.

== Background ==
On August 20, 2020, Asbury hosted the To Love a Fool Album Release Show, celebrating the successful release of his third studio album, To Love a Fool (2020), which had been released in late July, with Dante Bowe as the guest artist opening the event. Bethel Music premiered the concert film of the album release show on their YouTube channel on October 23, 2020. Asbury then released the album release show recordings of the songs for download and streaming on November 6, 2020.

== Critical reception ==
Professional ratings
Review scores
| Source | Rating |
|---|---|
| 365 Days of Inspiring Media | 5/5 |

Jonathan Andre in his 365 Days of Inspiring Media review gave a positive review of the album, concluding that the album is "full of wonder and awe, full of joy and heartfelt emotions as this 10 track live album (20 if you include all of the live music videos available to stream and purchase on Apple Music, alongside the audio recordings of the live album experience) showcases, verbatim, what To Love a Fool would sound like, live. Yes, these 10 tracks are the exact same as Cory's studio recording of the album in July 2020, and even though this album per se doesn't bring anything original or new to the table of Cory Asbury songs, the album nevertheless is still good, reminding me that for an artist to be great, means for them to sound just as good live as they do in the studio, and To Love a Fool — A Rooftop Experience is no exception."

== Commercial performance ==
In the United States, To Love a Fool – A Rooftop Experience launched at No. 20 on Billboard's Top Christian Albums Chart dated November 21, 2020.

== Track listing ==
To Love a Fool – A Rooftop Experience
| No. | Title | Writer(s) | Length |
|---|---|---|---|
| 1. | "Canyons" | Cory Asbury; Ethan Hulse | 5:11 |
| 2. | "Sparrows" | Jared Anderson; Asbury; Hulse; Andrew Ripp | 3:32 |
| 3. | "Crashing In (Spontaneous)" | Asbury; Hulse | 6:47 |
| 4. | "Nothing More Than You" | Asbury; Benjamin Hastings; Hulse | 4:42 |
| 5. | "Dear God" | Asbury; Aodhan King | 6:01 |
| 6. | "The Prodigal Song" | Asbury; Ran Jackson; Ricky Jackson | 5:11 |
| 7. | "I'm Sorry" | Asbury | 4:15 |
| 8. | "Faithful Wounds (Spontaneous)" | Asbury | 12:53 |
| 9. | "Unraveling" | Asbury | 5:31 |
| 10. | "The Father's House" | Asbury; Hastings; Hulse | 4:58 |
| Total length: | | | 59:05 |

To Love a Fool – A Rooftop Experience (Deluxe) — Apple Music exclusive
| No. | Title | Length |
|---|---|---|
| 11. | "Canyons" (Music Video) | 5:10 |
| 12. | "Sparrows" (Music Video) | 3:31 |
| 13. | "Crashing In (Spontaneous)" (Music Video) | 6:47 |
| 14. | "Nothing More Than You" (Music Video) | 4:40 |
| 15. | "Dear God" (Music Video) | 6:02 |
| 16. | "The Prodigal Song" (Music Video) | 5:10 |
| 17. | "I'm Sorry" (Music Video) | 4:13 |
| 18. | "Faithful Wounds (Spontaneous)" (Music Video) | 12:51 |
| 19. | "Unraveling" (Music Video) | 5:31 |
| 20. | "The Father's House" (Music Video) | 4:53 |

- Songwriting credits adapted from PraiseCharts.

== Charts ==
Chart performance for To Love a Fool – A Rooftop Experience
| Chart (2020) | Peak position |
|---|---|
| US Christian Albums (Billboard) | 20 |

== Release history ==
| Region | Date | Version | Format | Label | Ref. |
|---|---|---|---|---|---|
| Various | November 6, 2020 | Standard | Digital download; streaming | Bethel Music | |
| Various | November 6, 2020 | Deluxe | Digital download; streaming | Bethel Music | |
