= Reckless Love (song) =

2017 single by Cory Asbury

Single by Cory Asbury

from the album Reckless Love
- Released: October 27, 2017
- Recorded: September 2017
- Genre: Worship; CCM; soft rock
- Length: 5:31 (Original version); 4:00 (Radio version); 3:54 (version featuring Tori Kelly)
- Label: Bethel Music
- Songwriters: Caleb Culver; Cory Asbury; Ran Jackson
- Producers: Jason Ingram; Paul Mabury

Cory Asbury singles chronology
"My Beloved" (2009)	"Reckless Love" (2017)	"The Father's House" (2020)

Alternative cover
- Cover for version featuring Tori Kelly

Music videos
- "Reckless Love" (Acoustic) on YouTube
- "Reckless Love" (Live) on YouTube
- "Reckless Love" (Lyrics) on YouTube
- "Reckless Love" (feat. Tori Kelly) on YouTube

Audio sample
- "Reckless Love": file; help

"Reckless Love" is a song by Cory Asbury and it was released on October 27, 2017, as the lead single from his second studio album of the same name, Reckless Love (2018), via Bethel Music. The song also appeared on the album Bethel Music en Español (2019). The song was written by Caleb Culver, Asbury and Ran Jackson, with production being handled by Jason Ingram and Paul Mabury.

"Reckless Love" became Cory Asbury's first No. 1 single on the US Hot Christian Songs chart, issued by Billboard, in March 2018, and went on to peak at No. 3 on Billboard's Bubbling Under Hot 100, thus becoming his highest charting entry in his career. The song was ranked by Billboard as the biggest Christian song in 2018, and the fourth biggest Christian song of the 2010s.

The song achieved critical acclaim, having garnered several nominations and won the Song of the Year and Worship Song of the Year Awards at the 49th Annual GMA Dove Awards in 2018. It was nominated for the 2019 Grammy Award for Best Contemporary Christian Music Performance/Song. It was also nominated for Top Christian Song at the 2019 Billboard Music Awards.

In January 2020, Cory Asbury released a new version of "Reckless Love" which featured Tori Kelly, and a devotional book titled Reckless Love: A 40-Day Journey Into the Overwhelming, Never-Ending Love of God.

== Background ==
"Reckless Love" is a song written by Caleb Culver, Cory Asbury and Ran Jackson, which became popular when a live video of Bethel Music artist Steffany Gretzinger leading the song in a worship service at Bethel Church in Redding, California was published on YouTube in early 2017, accruing over 14 million views as of November 2018. Cory Asbury then released the song as an official single through Bethel Music in digital format in October 2017.

On January 5, 2018, the radio version of "Reckless Love" by Asbury was also released by Bethel Music in digital format, and set to impact Christian radio on February 16, 2018. However, the track was already spinning at radio stations across the United States three weeks prior to the impact date.

On January 8, 2020, Billboard announced that Cory Asbury had collaborated with Tori Kelly on the recording of a new version of "Reckless Love" which was intended to revive the song whilst promoting the release of his devotional, Reckless Love: A 40-Day Journey Into the Overwhelming, Never-Ending Love of God, which was released on January 7. The new recording, which was produced by Lael, was released on January 10, 2020.

== Writing and development ==
Cory Asbury told the story behind the song whilst leading it in worship at the Heaven Come Conference 2017, an event held by Bethel Music, citing the Parable of the Lost Sheep in Luke 15 as a scriptural reference point saying:

When I used the phrase, 'the reckless love of God,' when we say it, we're not saying that God Himself is reckless, He's not crazy. We are, however, saying that the way He loves, is in many regards, quite so. But what I mean is this: He's utterly unconcerned with the consequences of His own actions with regard to His own safety, comfort and well-being. ... He doesn't wonder what He'll gain or lose by putting Himself on the line, He simply puts Himself out there on the off-chance that you and I might look back at Him and give Him that love in return. His love leaves the ninety nine to find the one every time and to many practical adults that's a foolish concept. Well, what if He loses the ninety nine in finding the one, right? What if, finding that one lost sheep is and always will be supremely important?

– Cory Asbury

== Composition ==
The song is composed in the key of G♭ (G-flat) and has a tempo of 83 beats per minute. Asbury's vocal range spans from D♭_{4} to A♭_{5} throughout the song.

== Commercial performance ==
"Reckless Love" was Cory Asbury's debut entry on the US Hot Christian Songs chart, initially appearing at No. 16 as issued by Billboard on November 18, 2017, whilst topping the Christian Digital Song Sales chart as well. Billboard reported that in the week ending February 1, 2018, the single broke through the top ten of the Hot Christian Songs chart, peaking at No. 7 due to significant increases in streaming and radio airplay. "Reckless Love" attained the No. 1 spot on the US Hot Christian Songs chart according to an online article issued by Billboard dated March 1, 2018. The song has been No. 1 on Christian Songs for eighteen non-consecutive weeks. Asbury's single went on to become his first No. 1 on the Christian Airplay chart issued by Billboard, dated April 14, 2018, after major gains in radio airplay. The song spent 68 weeks in total on the Hot Christian Songs chart, spending 53 weeks in the Top 10. It was ranked as the top Christian Song of 2018 by Billboard.

== Music videos ==
The official audio video of "Reckless Love", showcasing the single's cover art, was uploaded on the YouTube channel of Bethel Music on October 28, 2017. The live music video which also includes the song story, performed and narrated by Cory Asbury, alongside Jenn Johnson and Brooke Ligertwood, recorded at the Heaven Come Conference 2017 at the Microsoft Theatre in Los Angeles, California was published on November 23, 2017, on Bethel Music's YouTube channel. On December 13, 2017, the acoustic video of the song being performed by Asbury with his son Gabriel in the background, recorded in Ashland, Oregon was also published by Bethel Music on YouTube. Bethel Music then published the official lyric video of "Reckless Love" on January 19, 2018 on YouTube.

== Live performances ==
Cory Asbury performed "Reckless Love" on The 700 Club following his interview with Gordon Robertson. Cory Asbury then performed the song alongside singers from Regent University on CBN's Studio 5 after being interviewed by Efrem Graham on the program. Asbury also sang the song with Christian singer-songwriter Francesca Battistelli at the 2018 K-Love Fan Awards at the Grand Ole Opry in Nashville, Tennessee. He also performed the song at Heaven Come Conference 2018 with Gateway Choir as the conference opener at the Verizon Theatre at Grand Prairie in Dallas, Texas.

== Controversy ==
The song has provoked controversy over the use of the word "Reckless" in respect of God's love. For example, popular Christian apologist Mike Winger, associate pastor at a Calvary Chapel, released a YouTube video examining the song and concluded the use of the word was not appropriate. Conversely, well-known pastor John Piper concluded that the word could be understood in a valid sense. The Christian Broadcasting Network published an article summarising some of the debate.

== Accolades ==
Awards
Year	Organization	Award	Result	Ref.
2018	K-Love Fan Awards	Song of the Year	Nominated	
2018	K-Love Fan Awards	Worship Song of the Year	Won	
2018	K-Love Fan Awards	Breakout Single of the Year	Won	
2018	GMA Dove Awards	Song of the Year	Won	
2018	GMA Dove Awards	Worship Song of the Year	Won	
2018	GMA Dove Awards	Worship Recorded Song of the Year	Nominated	
2019	Grammy Awards	Best Contemporary Christian Music Performance/Song	Nominated	
2019	We Love Christian Music Awards	Worship Song of the Year	Won	
2019	Billboard Music Awards	Top Christian Song	Nominated	

== Track listing ==
Reckless Love – Digital format
No.	Title	Length
1.	"Reckless Love"	5:31

Reckless Love (Radio version) – Digital format
No.	Title	Length
1.	"Reckless Love" (radio version)	4:00

Reckless Love (feat. Tori Kelly) – Digital format
No.	Title	Length
1.	"Reckless Love" (featuring Tori Kelly)	3:54

== Charts ==
=== Weekly charts ===
Chart (2017–18)	Peak position
US Bubbling Under Hot 100 (Billboard)	3
US Hot Christian Songs (Billboard)	1
US Christian Airplay (Billboard)	1
US Christian AC (Billboard)	1
US Digital Song Sales (Billboard)	37

=== Year-end charts ===
Chart (2018)	Peak position
US Christian Songs (Billboard)	1
US Christian Airplay (Billboard)	1
US Christian AC (Billboard)	1
US Christian CHR (Billboard)	12
US Weekend 22	15
Chart (2019)	Position
US Christian Songs (Billboard)	22
Chart (2020)	Position
US Christian Digital Song Sales (Billboard)	43
US Christian Streaming Songs (Billboard)	6
Chart (2021)	Position
US Christian Streaming Songs (Billboard)	13

=== Decade-end charts ===
Chart (2010s)	Position
US Christian Songs (Billboard)	4

== Certifications ==
Region	Certification	Certified units/sales
New Zealand (RMNZ)	Platinum	30,000^{‡}
United States (RIAA)	2× Platinum	2,000,000^{‡}
^{‡} Sales+streaming figures based on certification alone.

== Release history ==
Region	Date	Version	Format	Label	Ref.
Various	October 27, 2017	Album	Digital download; streaming	Bethel Music	
Various	January 5, 2018	Radio	Digital download; streaming	Bethel Music	
United States	February 16, 2018	Radio	Christian radio	Bethel Music	
Various	January 10, 2020	Featuring Tori Kelly	Digital download; streaming	Bethel Music	

== Cover versions ==
- American worship collective WorshipMob released a cover version of "Reckless Love" on YouTube, prior to the single's release.
- American musician Michael W. Smith released a cover of "Reckless Love" on his live album Surrounded (2018).
- American worship band Passion recorded "Reckless Love" live featuring the vocals of Melodie Malone for the album Whole Heart (2018). It reached No. 31 on Billboard's Hot Christian Songs chart.
- American CCM duo Shane & Shane covered the song for its extended play titled The Worship Initiative Vol. 15 (2018).
- American gospel artist Israel Houghton covered "Reckless Love" and released it as a single. Houghton's cover single reached No. 12 on Billboard's Hot Gospel Songs chart, and No. 35 on the Hot Christian Songs chart.
- Canadian pop singer Justin Bieber posted several videos of himself singing the song on social networking service Instagram, which went viral and received widespread coverage in Christian media outlets. He did an impromptu acoustic worship set at the Churchome church event during Coachella in Indio, California, wherein he sang "Reckless Love" in what became his first public performance since the Purpose World Tour.
- Bethel Music released its first spontaneous worship album titled Moments: Mighty Sound (2018), which includes a live recording of "Reckless Love (Spontaneous)" by Steffany Gretzinger at Bethel Church in Redding, California. It peaked at No. 38 on Billboard's Hot Christian Songs chart.
- Nevada-based CCM band I Am They released an acoustic performance video of the song. They released their own cover of the song as a single.
- New Wine released a cover featuring Abi Johnson on their live album, You Restore My Soul (2018).
- American musician Jo Dee Messina released a cover version of the song to country radio on September 28, 2018, with the digital release slated for October 12, 2018.
- American reggae band Christafari released a version of the song featuring Avion Blackman on their album, 99.4.1 (Reckless Love) (2018).
- Anthony Evans released his own rendition of the song as a single.
