= Onething conference =

Annual Christian conference

The Onething conference was an annual Christian conference put on by the International House of Prayer (IHOPKC) every December at the Bartle Hall Convention Center in Kansas City, MO. The conference focused on prayer, evangelism, worship and Christian eschatology. In addition to theological instruction, the speakers often deliver inspirational messages on themes such as living a life without regrets. The sessions often include long periods of prayer for the United States, sometimes lasting until midnight. A particular emphasis is given to prayer for colleges and college students. The last conference was held during the last week of 2018, and the conference has been placed on indefinite hold for the near future.

== History ==
The conference was initially inspired when Paul Cain, a former associate of International House of Prayer leadership, had a spiritual experience in which he saw thousands of young people gathering in Kansas City. The attendees numbered over 25,000 in 2010. Most attendees are young adults.

== Speakers and worship leaders ==
Speakers and worship leaders have included Mike Bickle, Francis Chan, Todd White, Reinhard Bonnke, Ronnie Floyd, Matt Maher, Delirious? Misty Edwards and Jason Upton

== See also ==
- Continual prayer
- The Call
