= Laura Hackett Park =

- Birth name: Laura Melinda Hackett
- Born: April 2, 1985 (age 40); Brunswick, Ohio
- Genres: Contemporary worship music
- Occupation(s): Singer, songwriter
- Instrument(s): Vocals, singer-songwriter, piano
- Years active: 2009–present
- Labels: Arrowhead Music, Watershed Music Group, Forerunner Music
- Website: laurahackettpark.com

Laura Hackett Park (born April 2, 1985, as Laura Melinda Hackett), is an American contemporary worship songwriter, worship leader, and recording artist who has composed worship songs sung by congregations around the world. She has led worship sets weekly at the International House of Prayer since 2003–over 10,000 hours of live worship meetings–and has traveled extensively both domestically and internationally to lead worship. Her sophomore album, Love Will Have Its Day was released by Forerunner Music on October 21, 2014, and became her breakthrough release onto the Billboard charts. Her latest EP, The Secret Place released in May 2021, and was featured by Spotify as the worship album of the week.

== Early life ==
Hackett Park was born Laura Melinda Hackett, in Brunswick, Ohio on April 2, 1985. Hackett Park's father is Edward A. Hackett of Michigan and her mother is Melinda Davis Hackett (née, Downey) of Florida. Hackett Park has an older sister, Doris Elizabeth Hackett, and a younger sister, Ellen Hackett. She along with her family attend International House of Prayer in Kansas City, Missouri. From an early age Laura started singing, playing the piano, and writing songs.

== Personal life ==
On October 4, 2014, she married Jonas Warner Park, a fellow songwriter, worship leader, and missionary at the International House of Prayer.

== Music career ==
Park's first album, Laura Hackett, was independently released in 2009. Her second album, Love Will Have Its Day, released by the Forerunner Music label would crack the Billboard charts, twice.

Park graduated with a bachelor's degree in Music Theory from the University of Missouri Kansas City in 2008. Laura has been invited to lead worship all over the globe (South Korea, Brazil, Israel). She also has led worship at major United States venues and ministry gatherings, such as Red Rocks Amphitheatre in Colorado, The SEND stadium gathering in Orlando, FL, and at nine of the International House of Prayer's Onething conferences, which saw 20,000+ young adults in attendance each year.

In 2018 Laura and her husband, Jonas Park, launched an independent music label called Arrowhead Music. In February 2020, Park signed to Arrowhead Music as an artist.

The first release under the Arrowhead Music label was the single, ”Artist,” released in April 2019 Laura's third studio release, The Secret Place, released on May 14, 2021, and includes the songs “Shalom,” Yeshua Messiah,” “You Must Increase,” and “Anointed One.” An instrumental version of the EP was released as a follow-up project on January 28, 2022. The 4-song EP is a compilation of what Laura describes as songs born from personal moments of prayer that she hopes will lead others into their own conversations with God.

SHORT FILM: The project is accompanied by a short film by the same title, featuring Laura’s live performances of each song, simply with her voice and keyboard, filmed at the International House of Prayer’s Global Prayer Room. Laura’s artist commentary between songs gives the audience a glimpse into her life of prayer and worship as a missionary and worshiper in the house of prayer and in her personal life, inspiring the viewer in their own life of communion with God.

Laura has over 30,000 monthly Spotify listeners and her songs have garnered 28 million streams on digital streaming services.

== Discography ==
=== Studio albums ===
List of studio albums, with selected chart positions
Title	Album details	Peak chart positions	
Title	Album details	US Chr	US Heat
The Secret Place (Instrumental)	Released: 2022 Label: Arrowhead Music		
The Secret Place (EP)	Released: May 14, 2021 Label: Arrowhead Music		
Onething Live: All Cry Glory	Released: 2017 Label: Forerunner Music		
Onething Live: Love Makes Us Strong	Released: 2016 Label: Forerunner Music		
Onething Live: Shout Your Name	Released: 2015 Label: Forerunner Music		
Love Will Have Its Day	Released: October 21, 2014; Label: Forerunner Music; CD, digital download	13	11
Onething Live: Sing Your Praises	Released: 2014 Label: Forerunner Music		
Onething Live: You Satisfy My Soul	Released: 2013 Label: Forerunner Music		
Onething Live: Magnificent Obsession	Released: 2012 Label: Forerunner Music		
Joy (Live)	Released: 2010 Label: Forerunner Music		
Onething Live: Where I Belong	Released: 2010 Label: Forerunner Music		
Laura Hackett	Released: 2009 Label: Independent		
