= The Father's House =

2020 single by Cory Asbury

Single by Cory Asbury

from the album To Love a Fool
- Released: January 24, 2020
- Recorded: 2019
- Genre: Worship
- Length: 4:13 (studio version); 4:22 (acoustic version)
- Label: Bethel Music
- Songwriters: Cory Asbury; Benjamin Hastings; Ethan Hulse
- Producer: Ed Cash

Cory Asbury singles chronology
"Reckless Love" (2017)	"The Father's House" (2020)	"Christ Be Magnified" (2020)

Music videos
- "The Father's House" (Acoustic) on YouTube
- "The Father's House" (Live) on YouTube
- "The Father's House" (Lyrics) on YouTube

"The Father's House" is a song performed by American contemporary worship musician Cory Asbury, which was released as the lead single to Asbury's third studio album, To Love a Fool, on January 24, 2020. Asbury collaborated with Ethan Hulse and Benjamin Hastings of Hillsong United in writing the song, and the production of the single was handled by Ed Cash.

"The Father's House" was a commercial success, having reached No. 3 on the US Hot Christian Songs chart while becoming Asbury's second top ten on the chart. "The Father's House" received a nomination for the GMA Dove Award Song of the Year at the 2021 GMA Dove Awards.

== Background ==
Cory Asbury announced on his social media that he would be releasing new music on January 24, 2020. On January 17, 2020, Asbury then announced that "The Father's House" would be released on January 24, availing the single for pre-save on Spotify.

On November 6, 2020, Asbury released the live version of "The Father's House" as part of his album, To Love a Fool – A Rooftop Experience (2020).

== Writing and development ==
Cory Asbury shared the story behind the song in an interview published on the Bethel Music website on January 23, 2020, saying:

"The Father’s House" was born a couple of years ago during a tour I was on. We had a few days off in Redding, California and I went to a house that overlooks the Sacramento River where our team usually meets to write music. My soul felt tired and weary, and I sat down at the piano because music is therapy for me. I just poured it out before God and went nuts. I did this for 15-20 minutes until this song came out, "You never want it perfect, you just want my heart." — Cory Asbury

Asbury added that during his hiatus, Benjamin Hastings had visited him at his home in Michigan and opined that the lyric was a verse, not a chorus, and from there on, began writing out the song.

== Composition ==
"The Father's House" is composed in the key of D♭ with a tempo of 81 beats per minute and a musical time signature of 4/4.

== Accolades ==
Awards
Year	Organization	Award	Result	Ref
2021	GMA Dove Awards	Song of the Year	Nominated	

== Commercial performance ==
"The Father's House" debuted at No. 16 on the US Hot Christian Songs chart dated February 8, 2020. Before its release, the song had spent five weeks on the Christian Airplay chart, having debuted at No. 45 on the issue dated January 11, 2020, and reaching No. 20 on the February 8 chart issue, indicating that the song received early radio airplay. In the song's eleventh week on Christian Airplay, the song reached No. 10, becoming his second top ten on the chart, after his 2018 hit single "Reckless Love". On the Hot Christian Songs chart dated March 28, 2020, "The Father's House" also became his second top ten, having peaked at No. 10.

== Music videos ==
The acoustic music video of "The Father's House" performed by Cory Asbury was released on Apple Music on January 24, 2020, with the lyric video of the song being published on Bethel Music's YouTube channel on the same day. The acoustic music video was then released to YouTube by Bethel Music on January 31, 2020. Bethel Music then released a live music video of the song being performed by Asbury at Bethel Church via YouTube on March 13, 2020.

== Track listing ==
The Father's House
No.	Title	Writer(s)	Length
1.	"The Father's House"	Cory Asbury; Benjamin Hastings; Ethan Hulse	4:13

The Father's House (Acoustic)
No.	Title	Length
1.	"The Father's House" (Acoustic)	4:22

The Father's House (Deluxe) — Apple Music exclusive
No.	Title	Length
1.	"The Father's House"	4:13
2.	"The Father's House" (Acoustic)	4:22
3.	"The Father's House" (Acoustic Music Video)	4:27
Total length:		13:02

== Charts ==
=== Weekly charts ===
Weekly chart performance for "The Father's House"
Chart (2020)	Peak position
US Hot Christian Songs (Billboard)	3
US Christian Airplay (Billboard)	1
US Christian AC (Billboard)	1

=== Year-end charts ===
Year-end chart performance for "The Father's House"
Chart (2020)	Position
US Christian Songs (Billboard)	6
US Christian Airplay (Billboard)	4
US Christian AC (Billboard)	1
US (WAY-FM)	8

== Release history ==
Region	Date	Version	Format	Label	Ref.
Various	January 24, 2020	Studio	Digital download; streaming	Bethel Music	
Various	January 24, 2020	Apple Music deluxe bundle	Digital download; streaming	Bethel Music	
Various	January 31, 2020	Acoustic	Digital download; streaming	Bethel Music	
