= New Season (Forrest Frank song) =

Promotional single by Forrest Frank

from the album The Jesus Generation
- Released: November 20, 2026
- Length: 4:24
- Label: River House
- Songwriter: Forrest Frank
- Producer: Frank

Forrest Frank singles chronology
"My Little Miracle" (2026)	"New Season" (2026)

Lyric video
- "New Season" on YouTube

"New Season" (Note: Stylized in all caps) is a song by the American contemporary Christian musician Forrest Frank. The song was released on November 20, 2026, via River House Records, as the fourth and final promotional single from Frank's ninth studio album, The Jesus Generation. The was both written and produced by Frank Himself.

== Release ==
Upon the announcement of Frank's upcoming ninth studio album, The Jesus Generation, he teased through Instagram portions of several tracks that were anticipated to appear on the album. Frank sought advice on social media of which tracks he would release ahead of the full album, and settled upon "New Season" as one. The song was released following three more songs by selected by the same means, including "What a Life" on October 30, 2026, and "Go! Go! Go!" on November 6, 2026, and "My Little Miracle" on November 13, 2026.

"New Season" was officially released on November 20, 2026, through River House Records, as the final of the four promotional singles from the album. Upon release, the song was promoted with the release of an official lyric video, which was uploaded to YouTube.

== Composition ==
Shore Fire found that "My Little Miracle" contains "stripped-back production." Wn.com observed that the song's "serene piano melody [...] allows the lyrics to take the spotlight, driving home the takeaway to continue believing in God's perfect plan."

== Track listing ==
All songs stylized in all caps.

New Season track listing
No.	Title	Lyrics	Music	Producer	Length
1.	"New Season"	Forrest Frank	Frank	Frank	4:24
2.	"My Little Miracle" (featuring Zvc)	Frank; Joy Elizabeth Bennett	Frank	Pera Krstajić^{[a]}	2:50
3.	"What a Life"	Frank; Krstajić	Frank; Krstajić	Frank; Krstajić	2:37
4.	"Okay!"	Axe Williams; D. Mills; Frank; Malachi O'Connor	Frank	Frank; Williams; Mills; O'Connor; Jordan Podilla; Josh Holiday	2:56
5.	"Go! Go! Go!" (featuring KB and Lecrae)	Frank; Kevin Burgess; Lecrae Moore; Krstajić	Frank; Krstajić	Frank; Krstajić	3:30
6.	"Jesus Is Alive!" (featuring Lost & Found)	Frank	Frank	Frank	2:08
Total length:					20:53

=== Notes ===
- ^{^[a]} indicates an additional producer.

== Release history ==
Release history and formats for "New Season"
Region	Date	Format(s)	Label(s)
Various	November 20, 2026	Digital download; streaming	River House Records
Various	December 4, 2026	CD; LP; cassette; digital download; streaming; (with The Jesus Generation)	River House Records
