= My Little Miracle =

Promotional single by Forrest Frank featuring Zvc

from the album The Jesus Generation
- Released: November 13, 2026
- Length: 2:50
- Label: River House
- Composer: Forrest Frank
- Lyricists: Frank; Joy Elizabeth Bennett
- Producer: Pera Krstajić

Forrest Frank chronology
"Go! Go! Go!" (2026)	"My Little Miracle" (2026)	"New Season" (2026)

Zvc chronology
"Fire in my Soul" (2026)	"My Little Miracle" (2026)

Lyric video
- "My Little Miracle" on YouTube

"My Little Miracle" (Note: Stylized in all caps) is a song by the American contemporary Christian musician Forrest Frank, featuring the American singer-songwriter Zvc. The song was released on November 16, 2026, via River House Records, as the third of four promotional singles from Frank's ninth studio album, The Jesus Generation. The was composed by Frank himself, while he wrote the lyrics alongside Joy Elizabeth Bennett, and produced was handled by Pera Krstajić. The song is Frank's fourth collaboration with Zvc, the first being "Christmas Through Your Eyes" from his collaborative Christmas album with Jvke, This Is What Christmas Feels Like (2025), and the second and third being the 2026 non-album singles "Jesus Is Alive!" and "2 Step the Enemy", respectively.

== Release ==
Upon the announcement of Frank's upcoming ninth studio album, The Jesus Generation, he teased through Instagram portions of several tracks that were anticipated to appear on the album. Frank sought advice on social media of which tracks he would release ahead of the full album, and settled upon "My Little Miracle" as one. The song was released following two more songs by selected by the same means, including "What a Life" on October 30, 2026, and "Go! Go! Go!" on November 6, 2026, as well as the subsequent "New Season" on November 20, 2026.

"My Little Miracle" was officially released on November 13, 2026, through River House Records, as the third of the four promotional singles from the album. Upon release, the song was promoted with the release of an official lyric video, which was uploaded to YouTube.

== Composition ==
Shore Fire found that "My Little Miracle" contains "acoustic strings, harmonious background vocals, and a soulful breakdown from Zvc." Wn.com observed that the song is lyrically about parenthood.

== Commercial performance ==
"My Little Miracle" received early attention from social media teasers, and had already achieved nearly two million views by the time of the song's release.

== Track listing ==
All songs stylized in all caps.

My Little Miracle track listing
No.	Title	Lyrics	Music	Producer	Length
1.	"My Little Miracle" (featuring Zvc)	Forrest Frank; Joy Elizabeth Bennett	Frank	Pera Krstajić^{[a]}	2:50
2.	"What a Life"	Frank; Krstajić	Frank; Krstajić	Frank; Krstajić	2:37
3.	"Okay!"	Axe Williams; D. Mills; Frank; Malachi O'Connor	Frank	Frank; Williams; Mills; O'Connor; Jordan Podilla; Josh Holiday	2:56
4.	"Go! Go! Go!" (featuring KB and Lecrae)	Frank; Kevin Burgess; Lecrae Moore; Krstajić	Frank; Krstajić	Frank; Krstajić	3:30
5.	"Jesus Is Alive!" (featuring Lost & Found)	Frank	Frank	Frank	2:08
Total length:					16:29

=== Notes ===
- ^{^[a]} indicates an additional producer.

== Personnel ==
Credits adapted from Tidal.

- Amanda Bradshaw – choir
- Andrew Keller – engineer
- Forrest Frank – composer, lyricist, vocals
- Grace Pehrman – choir
- Ilija Mihailovic – choir
- Jacob "Biz" Morris – mixer, masterer
- Joy Elizabeth Bennett – lyricist
- Pera Krstajić – additional producer, choir director
- Tyler Christian Lewis – choir
- Zac Lawson – vocals

== Release history ==
Release history and formats for "My Little Miracle"
Region	Date	Format(s)	Label(s)
Various	November 13, 2026	Digital download; streaming	River House Records
Various	December 4, 2026	CD; LP; cassette; digital download; streaming; (with The Jesus Generation)	River House Records
