= Go! Go! Go! =

Promotional single by Forrest Frank featuring KB and Lecrae

from the album The Jesus Generation
- Released: November 6, 2026
- Genre: Hip hop
- Length: 3:30
- Label: River House
- Songwriters: Forrest Frank; Kevin Burgess; Lecrae Moore; Pera Krstajić
- Producers: Frank; Krstajić

Forrest Frank chronology
"What a Life" (2026)	"Go! Go! Go!" (2026)	"My Little Miracle" (2026)

KB chronology
"Angel Armies" (2026)	"Go! Go! Go!" (2026)

Lecrae chronology
"Mad House II" (2026)	"Go! Go! Go!" (2026)

Music video
- "Go! Go! Go!" on YouTube

"Go! Go! Go!" (Note: Stylized in all caps) is a song by the American contemporary Christian musician Forrest Frank, featuring the American Christian rappers KB and Lecrae. The song was released on November 6, 2026, via River House Records, as the second promotional single from Frank's ninth studio album, The Jesus Generation. The song was written by Frank, Kevin Burgess, Lecrae Moore, and Pera Krstajić, while Frank and Krstajić produced. The song is Frank's second collaboration with Lecrae, the first being "Nothing but the Blood" from his fifth studio album, New Hymns (2023).

== Release ==
Upon the announcement of Frank's upcoming ninth studio album, The Jesus Generation, he teased through Instagram portions of several tracks that were anticipated to appear on the album. Frank sought advice on social media of which tracks he would release ahead of the full album, and settled upon "Go! Go! Go!" as one. The song was released subsequently to "What a Life", which was selected by the same means and released on October 30, 2026, as the first of the album's three promotional singles. The third, "My Little Miracle", was released on November 13, 2026, and the fourth, "New Season", was released on November 20, 2026.

"Go! Go! Go!" was released on November 6, 2026, through River House Records, as the second promotional single from the album. Upon release, the song was promoted with the release of an official lyric video, which was uploaded to YouTube. Alongside its release, the full album was made available for pre-order.

== Composition ==
Running for a duration of 3 minutes and 30 seconds, "Go! Go! Go!" is primarily a hip hop song, containing elements of contemporary Christian pop and gospel music, and featuring a minimalist, "stripped-back" production style. Shore Fire found that the song is centered around a "recurring piano motif and a steady bass", containing lyrics which urge the listener to "follow Christ's path wherever it leads." The track finds Frank performing in a "melodic style", while KB and Lecrae each deliver rap verses.

== Commercial performance ==
"Go! Go! Go!" made its chart debut on November 21, 2026, where it opened at its peak position of number 29 on the Billboard Hot Christian Songs chart.

== Track listing ==
All songs stylized in all caps.

Go! Go! Go! track listing
No.	Title	Lyrics	Music	Producer	Length
1.	"Go! Go! Go!" (featuring KB and Lecrae)	Forrest Frank; Kevin Burgess; Lecrae Moore; Krstajić	Frank; Krstajić	Frank; Krstajić	3:30
2.	"Jesus Is Alive!" (featuring Lost & Found)	Frank	Frank	Frank	2:08
3.	"What a Life"	Frank; Krstajić	Frank; Krstajić	Frank; Krstajić	2:37
4.	"Okay!"	Axe Williams; D. Mills; Frank; Malachi O'Connor	Frank	Frank; Williams; Mills; O'Connor; Jordan Podilla; Josh Holiday	2:56
Total length:					13:38

== Personnel ==
Credits adapted from Tidal.

- Amanda Bradshaw – choir
- Forrest Frank – producer, programmer, vocals, writer
- Grace Pehrman – choir
- Ilija Mihailovic – choir
- Jacob "Biz" Morris – mixing, masterer, writer
- KB – vocals, writer
- Lecrae – vocals, writer
- Pera Krstajić – producer, arranger, drums, piano
- Tyler Christian Lewis – choir

== Charts ==
Chart performance for "Go! Go! Go!"
Chart (2026)	Peak position
US Hot Christian Songs (Billboard)	29

== Release history ==
Release history and formats for "Go! Go! Go!"
Region	Date	Format(s)	Label(s)
Various	November 6, 2026	Digital download; streaming	River House Records
Various	December 4, 2026	CD; LP; cassette; digital download; streaming; (with The Jesus Generation)	River House Records
