= Maimonides Park =

Baseball park in Brooklyn, New York

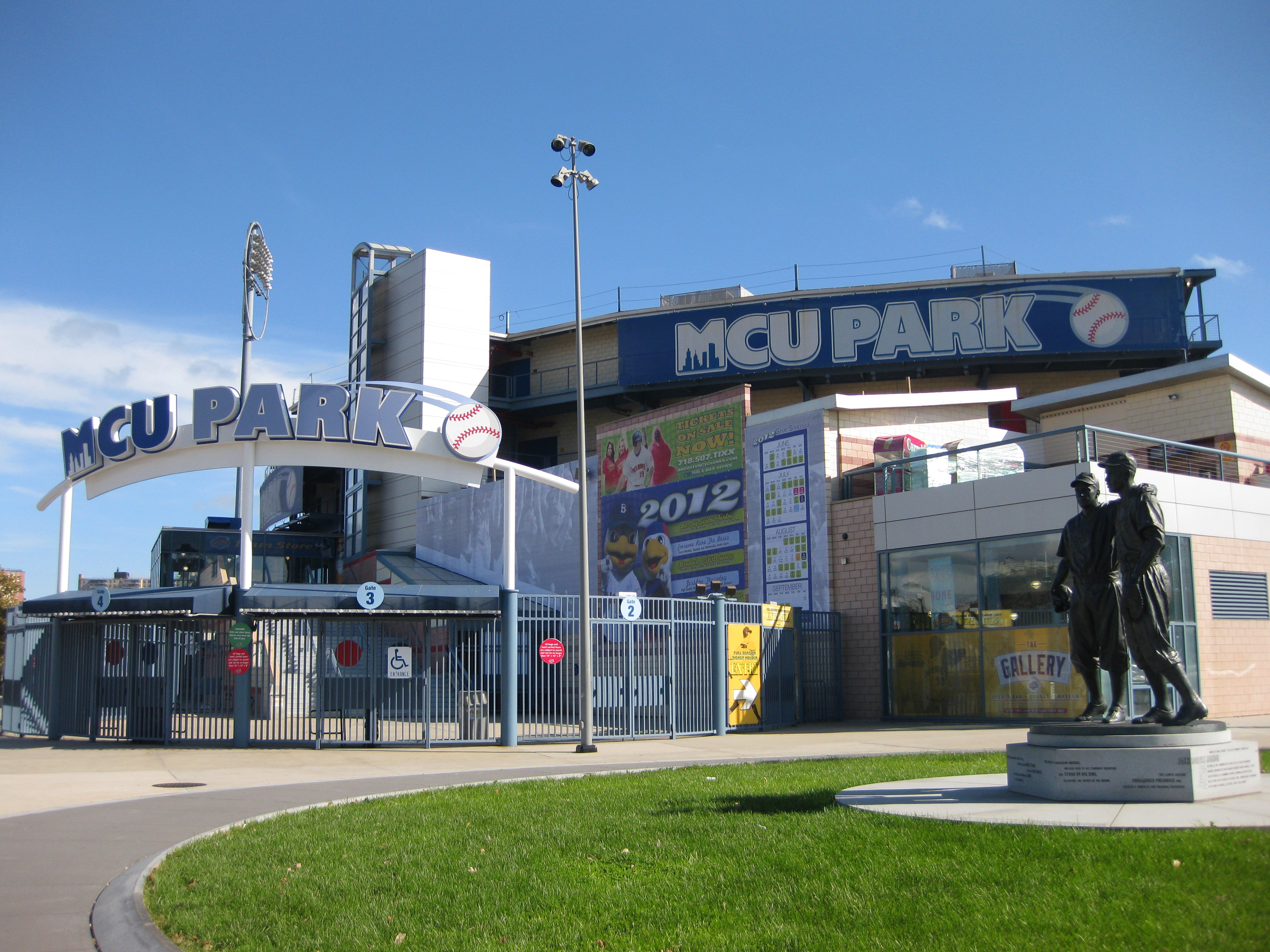
- Seen in 2012; the statue of Jackie Robinson and Pee Wee Reese is at the right

- Location within New York Location within the United States
- Interactive map of Maimonides Park
- Former names: KeySpan Park (2001–2009); MCU Park (2010–2021)
- Address: 1904 Surf Avenue; Brooklyn, New York 11224
- Coordinates: 40°34′28″N 73°59′03″W
- Owner: City of New York
- Operator: New York Mets
- Capacity: 7,000
- Surface: Artificial Turf (2013–present); Grass (2001–2012)
- Field size: Left Field – 315 ft (96 m); Center Field – 412 ft (126 m); Right Field – 325 ft (99 m)
- Public transit: New York City Subway: at Coney Island–Stillwell Avenue

Construction
- Groundbreaking: August 22, 2000
- Opened: June 25, 2001
- Cost: $55 million ($96.3 million in 2025 dollars)
- Architects: Jack L. Gordon Architects PC, AIA
- Structural engineer: Ysrael A. Seinuk, P.C.
- Services engineer: Keyspan Energy Management
- General contractor: Turner Construction

Tenants
- Brooklyn Cyclones (NYPL/SAL) 2001–present Brooklyn Bolts (FXFL) 2014–2015; NYU Violets (NCAA) 2015–2021; New York Cosmos (NASL) 2017; Rugby United New York (MLR) 2019–2020; New York Crush (ACBL) 2022; Brooklyn FC (USLS) 2025–present Brooklyn FC (USLC) 2026–present

Maimonides Park (formerly MCU Park and KeySpan Park) is a Minor League Baseball stadium on the Riegelmann Boardwalk in the Coney Island neighborhood of Brooklyn in New York City. The home team and primary tenant is the New York Mets-affiliated Brooklyn Cyclones of the South Atlantic League. The stadium has also hosted other teams and sports; the NYU Violets Baseball team began playing at Maimonides Park in 2015 through the 2021 season, and soccer club Brooklyn FC has its women's team playing at the ballpark since 2024, with its men's team joining them in 2026.

The official seating capacity at Maimonides Park is 7,000, though the Cyclones sell up to 2,500 more standing-room tickets. Prior to 2016, the capacity was 7,500 plus 2,500 standing room. Features include a concourse with free-standing concession buildings and overhanging fluorescent lamps in different colors, evoking an amusement park atmosphere. In addition, the park overlooks the Atlantic Ocean as well as the Parachute Jump in right field, and the Wonder Wheel and Coney Island Cyclone in left field.

== Site ==
Maimonides Park stands on the old site of Steeplechase Park, an old-time Coney Island amusement park that closed in 1964 amid crime and general deterioration of Coney Island and of the subway routes that run to the area. Maimonides Park is accessible via the New York City Subway at the Coney Island–Stillwell Avenue station, served by the D, F, <F>, N, and Q trains.

== History ==
Part of a general reinvestment in the Coney Island neighborhood, the stadium opened in 2001 as KeySpan Park, which had a capacity of 6,500. The opening of the park, and the Cyclones' permanent move there from their prior temporary home in Queens, marked the return of professional baseball to Brooklyn—albeit on a minor-league level—for the first time since MLB's Brooklyn Dodgers had played their last game at Ebbets Field in 1957 before moving to California the following season. Demand for Cyclones tickets was so great that the team added 1,000 seats in a right-field bleacher pavilion within three weeks after the park opened.

Maimonides Park and the Staten Island Yankees' Richmond County Bank Ballpark were paid for with public money, part of a deal that involved both the Mets and Yankees. The Yankees had to approve the arrival of the Cyclones, and the Mets had to approve a Yankee farm team in Staten Island. The two teams share MLB territorial rights to the New York City market, and have veto power over each other (and any other MLB organization).

In October 2012, Hurricane Sandy hit Brooklyn and caused extensive damage to the ballpark, including the front office, clubhouses, and team store. The entire playing surface, previously a natural grass field, had to be replaced with synthetic FieldTurf before the 2013 season.

=== Naming rights ===
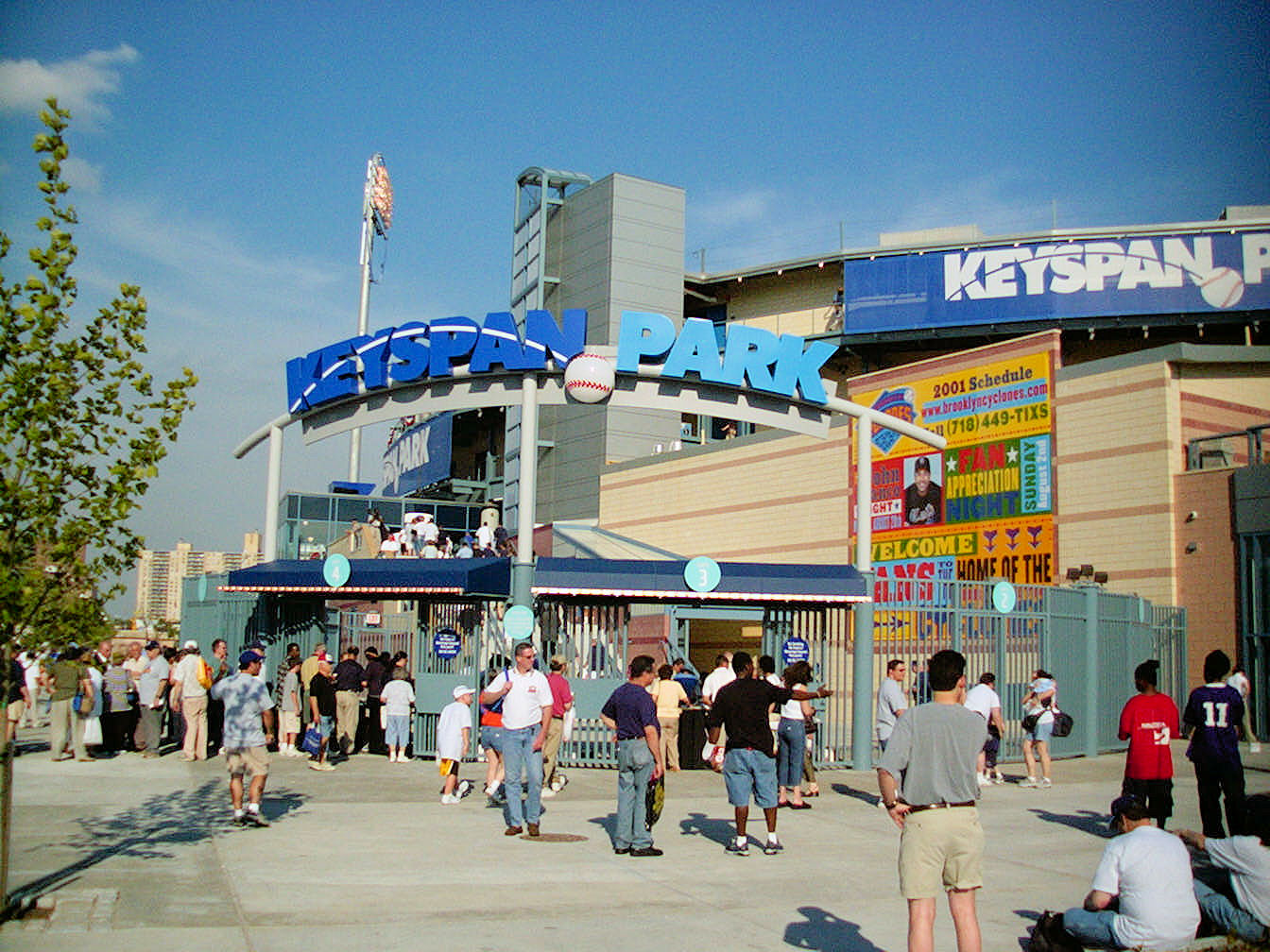
The stadium as KeySpan Park in 2001

The park's original name was part of a naming rights deal with KeySpan Energy, a utility company whose primary holding is the former Brooklyn Union Gas, until 2020. However, in 2007, KeySpan was acquired by United Kingdom-based National Grid plc, which retired the KeySpan name. On January 29, 2010, the Cyclones announced that they had ended the deal with National Grid because the KeySpan name no longer existed. On February 4, 2010, it was announced that the Municipal Credit Union, the city's largest credit union, signed an agreement for the ballpark to be called MCU Park in an eleven-year naming rights deal.

In 2021, MCU did not renew the naming rights deal. Maimonides Medical Center became the new sponsor.

== Baseball ==
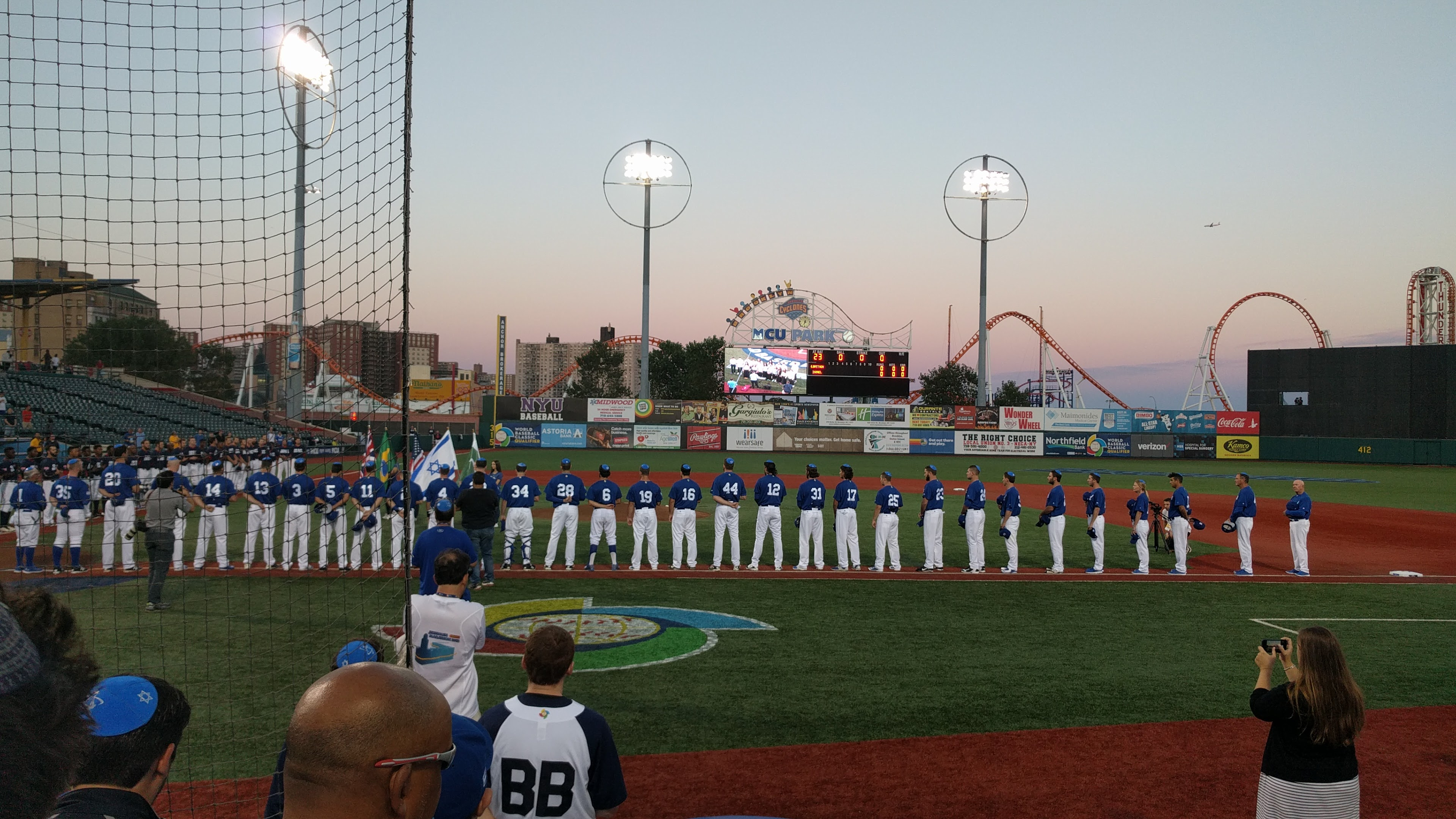
The park hosting the World Baseball Classic Qualifiers in 2016, after it was resurfaced with artificial turf

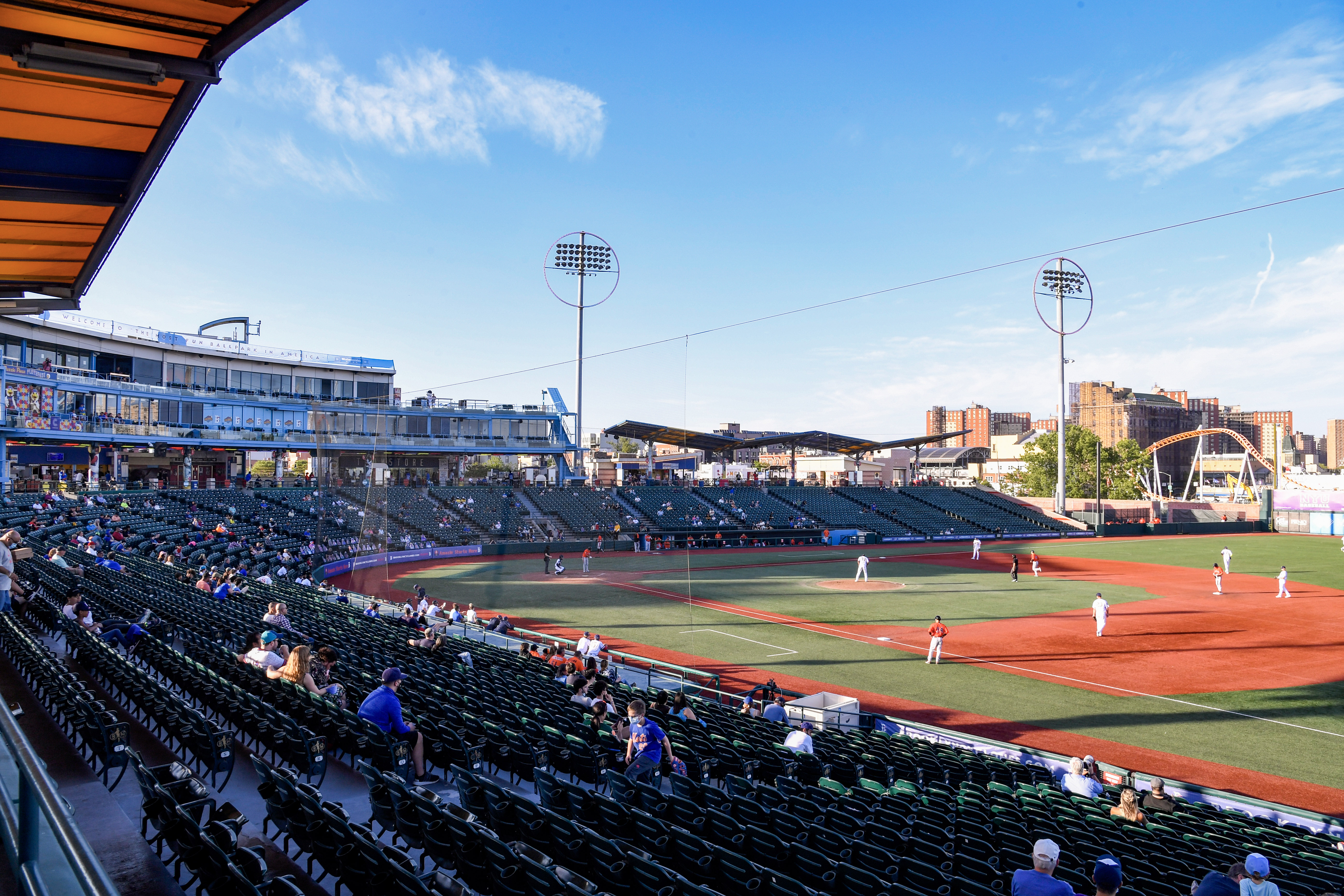
Detailed view of the stadium and field

In 2005 and 2014, MCU Park hosted the New York–Penn League All-Star Game.

In early 2015, the New York University Violets moved in and made Maimonides Park their home stadium. In the process, they forced the St. Joseph's College Bears to move out. Baruch College plays a few games at Maimonides Park, as do a few high school teams.

Following the 2015 season, a set of bleachers was removed, removing 500 seats from the ballpark. The area that housed the bleachers was turned into a picnic area.

Maimonides Park hosted a qualifying round for the 2017 World Baseball Classic in September 2016. Israel won the Qualifier over Great Britain, Brazil & Pakistan.

Maimonides Park served as the Mets' alternate training site in 2020 when the COVID-19 pandemic forced the cancellation of the Minor League Baseball campaign and the shortening of the Major League Baseball season.

As part of the restructuring of Minor League Baseball over the 2020–21 offseason, it was announced that the Cyclones would continue to operate in the Mets farm system, now their High-A team playing in the new High-A East.

== Other uses ==
=== Soccer ===
The New York Cosmos hosted their home games at Maimonides Park for the 2017 NASL season. The Cosmos had previously used Maimonides Park as a home field: once for a regular season match against the Ottawa Fury and once for a post season match against the Fort Lauderdale Strikers, both in 2015. The NASL cancelled its 2018 season, and the Cosmos later announced they would move to Mitchel Athletic Complex in Nassau County for their 2019 home games.

On January 19, 2024, it was announced that then-USL League One-hopeful expansion side Brooklyn FC planned to play home matches at Maimonides Park for their inaugural 2025 season, which would then be pushed back to the 2026 USL Championship season as they then looked to join the league one tier higher one year later. Brooklyn FC was granted an additional expansion side in the new first-division women's league USL Super League, to begin play at Maimonides Park for the 2024 season, after playing their fall half of the season at Commisso Soccer Stadium.

=== Football ===
The Brooklyn Bolts played their home games at Maimonides Park during the 2014 and 2015 Fall Experimental Football League seasons before folding. The football field was positioned in the outfield.

=== Rugby ===
Rugby United New York played its first two Major League Rugby seasons at MCU Park before moving to Cochrane Stadium in Jersey City, New Jersey.

=== Concerts ===
- In 2003, Björk performed two shows at Maimonides Park: on August 22 and August 23. Portions of these concerts appear in the Icelandic music documentary Screaming Masterpiece.
- In summer 2004, the jam band Phish began what was billed as its last tour with a two-night stand at Maimonides Park, with a guest appearance by rapper Jay-Z, a native of Brooklyn, on the second evening. The first concert was simulcast in movie theaters and in 2006, released (along with selected songs from the second night) as a concert album and DVD under the name Phish: Live in Brooklyn.
- In 2005, the stadium hosted the Across the Narrows Festival along with Richmond County Bank Ballpark. In the same year, The White Stripes performed one of their recent tours following the release of their album Get Behind Me Satan.
- In summer 2005, Def Leppard and Bryan Adams performed at Maimonides Park on July 9 as a part of their efforts to bring major league rock 'n' roll to America's Minor League Baseball parks during their 2005 cross-country "Rock 'N Roll Double-Header" tour.
- On August 9, 2007, the French electronic music duo Daft Punk performed in Maimonides Park during their Alive 2007 Tour.
- On July 16, 2008, 311 and Snoop Dogg played a show together.
- On July 13, 2009, Wilco performed with "very special guests" Yo La Tengo.
- On June 26 and 27, 2010, Furthur, featuring Grateful Dead members Phil Lesh and Bob Weir, performed at the park; they returned to perform again on July 13 and 14, 2012.
- On July 4, 2013, the String Orchestra of Brooklyn performed music of Dvorak and patriotic favorites as part of an Independence Day celebration with fireworks.

=== Wrestling ===
On July 2, 2010, Maimonides Park hosted a live Total Nonstop Action Wrestling house show, which also broke the TNA attendance record and became the most attended live TNA house show in the United States to date with a crowd of just under 5,550 fans.

On August 15, 2014, Ring of Honor Wrestling debuted at Maimonides Park with Field of Honor.

On August 22, 2015, Ring of Honor Wrestling returned to Maimonides Park with the second edition of Field of Honor.

On August 27, 2016, Ring of Honor Wrestling returned to Maimondes Park for the third time with Field of Honor.

=== Other ===
The ballpark hosted the annual Nathan's Famous Hot Dog Contest on July 4, 2021. The contest is usually held in a public plaza on Coney Island (at the location of The Original Nathan's Restaurant on the corner of Surf and Stillwell), but, for 2021, was temporarily relocated due to capacity restrictions and other health and safety requirements related to the COVID-19 pandemic. At that event, Joey Chestnut set a world record of 76 hot dogs and buns within 10 minutes.

In 2023, the park hosted the inaugural One Bite Pizza Festival by Dave Portnoy, the founder of Barstool Sports, which was organized by production company Medium Rare. Over 35 pizzerias participated, including establishments such as Frank Pepe Pizzeria Napoletana, Sally's Apizza, and Lucali. The festival attracted more than 5,000 attendees who sampled pizzas selected by Portnoy, based on his popular "One Bite" pizza review series.
