= Know Your Enemy (podcast) =

American political podcast

- Genre: Political

Cast and voices
- Hosted by: Matt Sitman and Sam Adler-Bell

Music
- Theme music composed by: Will Epstein
- Opening theme: Bad Touch
- Ending theme: Moonlight Mind

Production
- Production: Jesse Brenneman

Publication
- Original release: 2019

Related
- Website: Official website

Know Your Enemy is a political podcast about the American conservative movement from a socialist and religious leftist perspective. It is hosted by two freelance writers: Matthew Sitman, a former conservative, and Sam Adler-Bell, a lifelong leftist. Created in 2019 and sponsored by the American Left magazine Dissent, the podcast covers the conservative movement's intellectual foundations and has a bipartisan listenership.

Episodes frequently take the form of "deep dives into conservative intellectual history", but have occasionally featured guest appearances from "enemies" such as New York Times opinion columnist Ross Douthat, and National Review contributor Nate Hochman. Featured historical subjects have included the life of ex-communist conservative intellectual Frank Meyer, Joan Didion's conservatism, and a three-part series on the right-wing effort to overturn Roe v. Wade.

As of 2024, the show is financially underwritten by more than 7,500 Patreon supporters, who contribute more than $36,000 each month. About 30,000 listeners stream each episode.

In February 2023, Young America's Foundation filed a trademark infringement complaint against Sitman, Adler-Bell, and Dissent over the name of one of the Know Your Enemy podcast's Patreon tiers, "Young Americans for Freedom", complaining that it was "likely to deceive the relevant consuming public into believing, mistakenly, that the Podcast's services originate from, are associated or affiliated with, or otherwise authorized by the Plaintiff." The foundation's complaint was withdrawn without prejudice in July 2023.
