= Calendargate =

2023 controversy among US conservatives

Images used in the calendar arranged in an online promotional montage

The Calendargate controversy among American conservatives developed in December 2023 after the release of a 2024 calendar featuring photographs of female conservative activists and commentators, several of whom wore revealing clothing. Debates online among conservatives, including some of the women who had posed for the calendar, continued on social media websites into 2024.

Social conservatives, evangelicals, and postliberals criticized it for its display of public sexuality. More libertarians and barstool conservatives sided in favor of the calendar against the criticism, describing it as overly puritanical and censorious. Observers from that side of the political spectrum cited the controversy as reflecting continued tension between the two factions that had united to support former president Donald Trump in his re-election bid.

== History ==
In 2023, conservatives, angered that AB InBev had hired trans woman influencer Dylan Mulvaney as a brand ambassador for Bud Light, launched a boycott. In April 2023, Seth Weathers, under the name Conservative Dad, launched Ultra Right Beer, brewed in Gwinnett County, Georgia, as an alternative. Within two weeks, he reported over $1 million from sales of 20,000 six-packs.

In early December 2023, Ultra Right offered as merchandise on its website "Conservative Dad's Real Women of America 2024 Calendar". It featured pictures of women known as conservative commentators, influencers, and activists in pin-up poses, many of whom were wearing minimal attire. (Note: Loesch is wearing a T-shirt, jeans and lifting an assault rifle in each arm) One of the images featured conservative commentator Ashley St. Clair wearing a black bra and pearl necklace while sitting in a bubble bath, an apparent reference to one of Mulvaney's Bud Light videos. Ultra Right said that 10% of the calendar's sales would go to the Riley Gaines Center to "protect women's sports from extreme leftist ideology seeking to destroy real women".

In 2025, Ultra Right Beer released a second calendar titled "Conservative Dad's™ MAGA Babes: Make America Hot & Healthy Again."

== Reaction ==
Some conservative commentators reacted negatively in a vigorous online debate later that month around the Christmas holidays, criticizing it as lustful, with Bryson Gray even calling it "demonic". Former Trump attorney Jenna Ellis responded to another tweet mocking Gaines for posing so suggestively for the calendar after having cited fears of locker-room voyeurism to justify excluding trans women from sports. She wrote: "This is the problem with conservatives who think they can act just like the secular world. If conservatives aren't morally grounded Christians, what are we even 'conserving'?"

Commentators who supported the calendar not only described social conservatives as being prudish but saw it as also taking a stand against homosexuality. Proud Boys co-founder Gavin McInnes called the controversy "literally gay" and added: "You're allowed to enjoy looking at sexy, beautiful women. It's healthy and normal. Grow up." Scott Greer, a former editor at The Daily Caller, wrote that "[t]he outrage over the tacky conservative dad calendar proves that the chief enemy for some conservative women is male sexuality. There is a reason why so many of them marry closet cases." One commenter, quoted in The Daily Dot, argued that the controversy showed that "[t]he movement conservative doesn’t want a world without a tyrannical priest class ... they just want to replace the femminist-nuerotic-flamboyant priest class with their own alliance of the bowtied, resentful, and closeted."

=== Conservative responses ===
National Review Online columnist Madeline Kearns observed that the calendar laid bare a faultline among conservatives regarding sexuality in culture: "Either the sexual revolution was fun and games until a bunch of overzealous feminists and LGBT activists ruined it, or the sexual revolution was doomed from the start and the '90s-style smut found in advertising, movies, and calendars isn't much removed from our present degradation." She took the latter position, that conservatives should seek the restoration of "a courtship culture, one that emphasizes male and female sexual complementarity, abstinence before marriage, fidelity within it, openness to the gift of children, as well as the cultivation of a culture in which beauty is prized over the vulgar and obscene."

At another conservative publication, The Washington Examiner, Tiana Lowe Doescher took the opposite viewpoint, calling the calendar "anodyne and innocuous at worst ... PG-13 and tolerably cringe". The debate it provoked was likewise "the dumbest possible online nontroversy". She chided critics calling it pornographic, noting that conservatives had largely won their political and cultural battle over sexually explicit material online, at least as far as restricting minors' access to it. "#Calendargate is a dud for the conservative movement, and on a personal level, it reeks of simple internalized sexism, as though women's bodies should be shrouded rather than celebrated."

Nate Hochman, a conservative writer and activist, who had in 2021 defended Turning Point USA's controversial decision to rescind porn star Brandi Love's invitation to appear at their conference, found fault with both sides in an essay about the controversy in The American Conservative, a paleoconservative publication. He wrote: "In the abstract, calendars with pictures of women in bikinis aren't much to write home about" but that what he found "exceptionally off-putting" about the Real Women of America calendar—"a ham-handed right-wing effort to be hip"—was that it had been created by and for conservatives. He explained: "It's difficult not to feel a certain number of secondhand embarrassment for everyone involved." At the same time, Hochman wrote, "the calendar's critics ... veered into much more bizarre territory", in particular proposing instead that it show conservative women either pregnant or attending to children, "somehow an even more disconcerting concept". The underlying problem according to Hochman was conservatives' failure to articulate a vision of what American culture should be, or even a consistent critique of what it was. He explained:

[C]onservatives no longer have the foggiest idea of what a 'culture' actually is, let alone what it would take to shape one... Instead of creating an authentic counterculture—one that might someday be able to challenge the hegemony of our decaying mainstream institutions—conservatives are locked in a dialectic relationship with the very social norms and mores that they ostensibly seek to overcome.

=== Progressive responses ===
The progressive media outlet Vox called Calendargate "deeply revealing about the fault lines inside the conservative movement". Writer Zack Beauchamp identified the conflict as between social conservatives who prioritized "traditional values" while on the other he identified the more libertarian-leaning "Barstool conservatives" ("leave-me-alone bros who resent what they see as censorious political correctness"), a divide he traced back to a 1966 debate between William F. Buckley Jr. and Hugh Hefner, with newer postliberals like Missouri senator Josh Hawley joining the social conservatives in urging a greater role for government. Calendargate "exposes the ways in which the attempts to remake conservatism in the 'anti-woke' era will create new sources of tension inside the conservative camp—and highlights the way this struggle might play out inside conservative cultural spaces."

At Salon, Amanda Marcotte characterized the Barstool faction as having more traditional views of patriarchy, "see[ing] sex as men's right and women's burden—and childbirth and marriage as ways to trap women into servitude to men", and observed that the social conservatives understood that was "a hard sell outside of their circles" politically. According to Marcotte, Trump's success and their tacit acceptance of his embrace of this viewpoint left them "lying in the bikini photoshoot bed they made for themselves". Mediaite derived the message of Calendargate to be that "[c]onservatives should be upholding family values like the sanctity of marriage, honoring women, especially the mothers of their children, celebrating 'real' women without objectifying them, but also reiterating the alpha male status that will make America great again."

Progressive journalist Kevin Drum wrote on his blog: "I only wish that I believed this would become a huge, ongoing fight rather than petering out (so to speak) after a few weeks. But this isn't the kind of thing Fox News will obsess about, so it's unlikely to last." He took no position on the issues involved but, noting that this sort of internal feud was more common on the political left, said it was "nice to see conservatives taking a crack at it. Let's keep it going, OK?"

Vice writer Magdalene Taylor took note of a video Isabella Marie DeLuca, another young conservative influencer, had posted in October of herself baking a cake that had drawn fresh attention after Calendargate. In the video, her breasts under her T-shirt are prominent while she bakes. It does not focus on them nor otherwise draw attention to them but some commentators suggested DeLuca was drawing attention to "the spectacle of those giant ta tas" anyway, or that they expected her to add a link to her supposed OnlyFans page. She said that the labeling of that content as well as the calendar images as "pornographic", despite the minimal sexual aspect, showed how pervasive pornography was in modern culture. She added: "[It] really does increasingly dictate how we view the world, and many now broadly define porn as anything that seeks our attention. .. By calling everything porn, we're not really making any sort of point. We're just making more porn."

== See also ==
- List of -gate scandals and controversies
