= Crislyn D'Souza-Schorey =

American-Indian biologist

- Born: Bombay, India

Academic background
- Education: University of Texas Health Science Center at San Antonio (PhD, 1992)

Crislyn D'Souza-Schorey is an American-Indian biologist. She is the Morris Pollard Professor and former Department Chair of Biological Sciences at the University of Notre Dame. D'Souza-Schorey researches how membrane trafficking impacts cell motility under normal conditions and in disease states.

== Early life and education ==
D'Souza-Schorey was born and raised in Bombay, India. She completed her bachelor's degree in India at the age of 19 and remained there for her Master's degree. D'Souza-Schorey then moved to the United States where she completed her PhD at the University of Texas Health Science Center at San Antonio in 1992.

Following her PhD, D'Souza-Schorey accepted a postdoctoral fellowship at Washington University School of Medicine. In this role, she began researching therapeutics and diagnostics tools to cure cancer, specifically ARF6. Her research led to the discovery that ARF6 played a role in endosomal membrane trafficking and also governed structural organization at the cell surface.

== Career ==
Following her postdoctoral fellowship, D'Souza-Schorey joined the University of Notre Dame faculty as the Walther Cancer Institute Junior Chair in 1998. Upon starting her own laboratory, she found that ARF6 regulated cell-cell contact. D'Souza-Schorey then began looking into how epithelial cells developed by examining how the protein affected and altered tumor cells.

In 2009, she published a paper which identified a unique population of microvesicles that are enriched in proteases-mediators of tissue degradation. The release of these microvesicles provides a mechanism of tissue breakdown and remodeling at distant sites. As a result of her academic accomplishments, D'Souza-Schorey was elected a Fellow of the American Association for the Advancement of Science in 2012.

In 2014, D'Souza-Schorey became the first woman to be appointed the Department Chair of Biological Sciences at Notre Dame. While serving in this role, she received a patent for a method for detecting invasive microvesicles derived from tumor cells. In 2020, D'Souza-Schorey was recognized with the school's Faculty Award for her "outstanding service to the University such as through leadership activities, mentoring faculty colleagues, or exemplary dedication to students." Later that year, she stepped down as department chair and was replaced by Jason Rohr. In 2022, D'Souza-Schorey was named co-editor-in-chief of the Federation of American Societies for Experimental Biology BioAdvances journal.

== Personal life ==
D'Souza-Schorey is married to biologist Jeffrey Schorey and they have one son together.
