= One Bite Pizza Festival =

Food festival in New York City, United States

One Bite Pizza Festival is an annual food festival in New York City, organized in partnership between Dave Portnoy, founder of Barstool Sports, and Medium Rare, an event production company. Started in 2023, the festival unites pizzerias from across the U.S. to celebrate pizza culture.

== Overview ==
The first One Bite Pizza Festival occurred on September 23, 2023, at Maimonides Park in Coney Island, Brooklyn. It was launched by the founder of Barstool Sports, Dave Portnoy, and Medium Rare. Over 35 pizzerias participated, including establishments such as Frank Pepe Pizzeria Napoletana, Sally's Apizza, and Lucali. The festival attracted more than 5,000 attendees who sampled pizzas selected by Portnoy, based on his popular "One Bite" pizza review series. In addition, the event featured live musical performances and a live presentation of Portnoy's pizza reviews.

The festival returned on September 14, 2024, at Randall's Island in New York City. Expanding on its success, the 2024 event accommodated 10,000 attendees across two sold-out sessions. The event again showcased over 35 pizzerias, including Frank Pepe, Sally's Apizza, and Lucali. Portnoy donated all proceeds from the festival to Al Santillo, the owner of Santillo's Brick Oven Pizza, which had burned down earlier in the year. A GoFundMe campaign started by Portnoy raised more than $32,000 to help with rebuilding Santillo's.

The third One Bite Pizza Festival was held on September 13, 2025, at Maimonides Park in Coney Island.
