= Shaq's Fun House =

American annual music festival

Shaq's Fun House is an annual music festival organized by former basketball player Shaquille O’Neal and Medium Rare. It features performances from hip-hop and EDM artists, carnival-style activities, and circus acts. It has been held since 2018, and is held in the same city as the Super Bowl on the Friday before the game. Shaq's Fun House is an all inclusive event that features free food and drinks.

Two related virtual events were also held called Shaq's Fun House vs. Gronk Beach in 2020 and Shaq Bowl in 2021.

== History ==
=== 2018 - Shaq's Fun House (Miami) ===
The first Shaq's Fun House was held during Miami Music Week in March 2018. Its lineup included artists such as Diplo, Steve Aoki, A-Trak, Carnage, and O’Neal himself. One of the most viral moments from the inaugural Shaq's Fun House was when 4x Super Bowl champion Rob Gronkowski jumped on Shaquille's shoulders next to Von Miller domino affecting into an epic dance battle.

=== 2019 - Shaq's Fun House (Atlanta) ===
The second Shaq's Fun House was held in Atlanta at The Battery Atlanta in 2019. It featured artists such as Lil’ Jon, Tiësto, and Migos. It also featured a special collaborative performance from SHAQ and Cirque du Soleil. The event also featured catering from Waffle House and Krispy Kreme. With custom decor and graphics from the Atlanta's own Monte Carlo Productions. Celebrity attendance in Atlanta included Adam Levine, Jamie Foxx, Akon, Patrick Mahomes, Reggie Bush, Adrian Peterson, Evander Holyfield, and many more.

=== 2019 - Shaq's Fun House (Miami) ===
Shaq's Fun House returned to Miami on March 29, 2019, during Miami Music Week. The lineup was unannounced and included Armin van Buuren, Diplo, Kaskade, Oliver Heldens, NGHTMRE, Nitti Gritti, Lil Jon, Sunnery James & Ryan Marciano, Laidback Luke, Carnage, Slushii, Matt Medved, and Diesel (O'neal himself).

=== 2020 - Shaq's Fun House (Miami) ===
The festival returned to Miami for its 3rd time in January 2020 and was held at the Mana Wynwood Convention Center. The event's performers included Diddy, Diplo, DaBaby, Pitbull, Tiesto, Carnage and DJ set from DJ Diesel. For the 2020 event, O’neal partnered with WYNN Las Vegas to operate all VIP and bottle service operations.

=== 2020 - Shaq’s Fun House vs. Gronk Beach (Virtual, Orlando) ===
In June 2020, Medium Rare also held a livestreamed event combining their Shaq's Fun House and Gronk Beach events called "Shaq’s Fun House vs. Gronk Beach" to raise money for charity. The event was hosted by O’Neal and professional football player Rob Gronkowski and it raised funds for the Boys and Girls Club and the NAACP. The event won a Webby Awards in the category of Sports, General Virtual & Remote.

=== 2021 - The Shaq Bowl (Virtual, Tampa) ===
Shaq's Fun House was not held in 2021, due to complications from the COVID-19 pandemic. Instead a livestream event called Shaq Bowl was held, featuring two celebrity teams competing in a variety of challenges with the winner earning the first-ever SHAQ Bowl Trophy.

=== 2022 - Shaq's Fun House (Los Angeles) ===
The 2022 iteration of Shaq's Fun House was held at the Shrine Auditorium in Los Angeles. It featured performances from artists such as Lil’ Wayne, Zedd, and Diplo, along with a DJ set from O’Neal.

=== 2023 - Shaq's Fun House (Phoenix) ===
The 2023 iteration of Shaq's Fun House was held in Phoenix. It featured performances from artists such as Snoop Dogg, Diplo, and Myles O'Neal, along with a DJ set from SHAQ.

=== 2024 - Shaq's Fun House (Las Vegas) ===
The 2024 iteration of Shaq's Fun House was held at the Wynn in Las Vegas. It featured performances from artists such as Lil’ Wayne, and Diplo, along with a DJ set from O’Neal.

== See also ==
- Gronk Beach
