= Jason Rohr =

American researcher and academic

Jason R. Rohr
- Occupations: Biologist and academic

Academic background
- Education: B.A., Biology and Environmental Studies; M.A., Teaching Biology; Ph.D., Ecology and Behavior
- Alma mater: Binghamton University

Academic work
- Institutions: University of Notre Dame; University of South Florida

Jason R. Rohr is an American biologist and an academic. He is the Galla Professor and Chair of the Department of Biological Sciences at the University of Notre Dame, USA.

Rohr's research has explored how human-driven environmental changes—such as pollution, climate change, and biodiversity loss—have affected ecosystems, disease transmission, and public health. He has studied amphibian declines, freshwater systems, zoonotic diseases, and sustainable food production, and has conducted field studies, laboratory experiments, and modeling to address global challenges.

In 2024, he was awarded the International Frontiers Planet Prize by the Frontiers Research Foundation and was elected Fellow of the American Association for the Advancement of Science in 2017.

== Education ==
Rohr received a dual B.A. in Biology and Environmental Studies in 1996 followed by an M.A. in Teaching Biology in 1997 from Binghamton University. Later, in 2002, he completed his Ph.D. in Ecology and Behavior from the same institution.

== Career ==
After completing his PhD, Rohr joined the University of Kentucky in 2002 as a Postdoctoral Research Associate, a position he held until 2004. From 2004 to 2007, he was a Research Associate at Penn State University. In 2007, he joined the University of South Florida as an Assistant Professor, becoming Associate Professor in 2011 and Full Professor in 2017, serving until 2019.

In 2019, Rohr was appointed as the endowed Ludmilla F., Stephen J., and Robert T. Galla Professor in Biological Sciences at the University of Notre Dame. He is also the chair of department of Biological Sciences at the University of Notre Dame.

== Media coverage ==
Rohr's work has been featured in media outlets, including Fox News, and World News, as well as in an opinion piece authored by Andrew C. Revkin and published in The New York Times. His paper on global change drivers and the risk of infectious disease was also covered by The New York Times, wherein the paper was called valuable for revealing broad patterns within ecosystems.

Rohr's research has also been cited in The New Yorker, The Tampa Times, The Guardian, The Atlantic, Reuters, National Geographic, Nature and Science magazines, and on NPR.

== Research ==
Rohr has conducted research in behavioral ecology, ecotoxicology, and infectious disease biology. Some of his work has focused on amphibian declines linked to infectious diseases. His lab presented evidence that the chytrid fungus was not amphibian-specific, demonstrating its persistence in other hosts. His research on agrochemicals revealed links between pesticide exposure and increased parasite infections in amphibians. He also showed that environmental factors, such as temperature and pollution, interact to exacerbate amphibian disease susceptibility and associated declines.

Rohr's work in ecotoxicology has focused on the impact of synthetic chemicals on wildlife populations. He conducted research on the adverse effects of agrochemicals, particularly atrazine. His meta-analyses showed consistent negative effects of atrazine and other pesticides on amphibians and freshwater vertebrates.

Along with collaborators, Rohr proposed the thermal mismatch hypothesis, which explained how climate change influences infectious disease risks by altering host-pathogen interactions. His work showed that temperature anomalies contribute to disease outbreaks, with host susceptibility varying depending on whether the species is warm- or cold-adapted. Rohr's research has shown that multiple global change drivers—including biodiversity loss, pollution, habitat destruction, climate change, and invasive species—interact to influence infectious disease dynamics. His work emphasized that urbanization can sometimes decrease disease risk, while conservation efforts, such as reducing greenhouse gas emissions and preserving biodiversity, are critical for mitigating disease outbreaks.

Some of Rohr's research has dealt with how agrochemical impacts extend to human health, showing how fertilizers and pesticides increase the risk of schistosomiasis. His studies in Africa tested interventions that reduced disease risk and improved agricultural productivity. As part of their study, they removed invasive vegetation that serves as a snail habitat and repurposed it into fertilizer, livestock feed, or fuel for biodigesters; and presented it as a strategy to mitigate disease and promote economic and agricultural sustainability.

== Awards and honors ==
- 2012 – Career Award, United States Environmental Protection Agency
- 2016 – Jerome Krivanek Distinguished Teacher Award, University of South Florida
- 2017 – Fellow, American Association for the Advancement of Science
- 2023 – George Mercer Award, Ecological Society of America
- 2024 – Sustainability Science Award, Ecological Society of America
- 2024 – U.S. National Frontiers Planet Prize, US National Academy of Sciences, Engineering, and Medicine
- 2024 – International Frontiers Planet Prize, Frontiers Research Foundation
- 2024 – Climate and Health Scholar, National Institute of Environmental Health Sciences
- 2025 – Fellow, Ecological Society of America
- 2025 – Research Achievement Award, University of Notre Dame
- 2025 – Clarivate Highly Cited Researcher, Clarivate

== Bibliography ==
=== Selected articles ===
- Rohr, Jason R.; Schotthoefer, A. M.; Raffel, T. R.; Carrick, H. J.; Halstead, N.; Hoverman, J. T.; Beasley, V. R. (16 October 2008). "Agrochemicals increase trematode infections in a declining amphibian species". Nature. 455 (7217): 1235–1239. Bibcode:2008Natur.455.1235R. doi:10.1038/nature07281. PMID 18972018.
- Civitello, David J.; Cohen, J.; Fatima, H.; Halstead, N. T.; Liriano, J.; McMahon, T. A.; Rohr, J. R. (14 July 2015). "Biodiversity inhibits parasites: broad evidence for the dilution effect". Proceedings of the National Academy of Sciences. 112 (28): 8667–8671. Bibcode:2015PNAS..112.8667C. doi:10.1073/pnas.1506279112. PMC 4507196. PMID 26069208.
- Cohen, J. M.; Lajeunesse, M. J.; Rohr, J. R. (March 2018). "A global synthesis of animal phenological responses to climate change". Nature Climate Change. 8 (3): 224–228. Bibcode:2018NatCC...8..224C. doi:10.1038/s41558-018-0067-3.
- Rohr, Jason R.; Barrett, Christopher B.; Civitello, David J.; Craft, Meggan E.; Delius, Bryce; DeLeo, Gustavo A.; Tilman, David (June 2019). "Emerging human infectious diseases and the links to global food production". Nature Sustainability. 2 (6): 445–456. Bibcode:2019NatSu...2..445R. doi:10.1038/s41893-019-0293-3. PMC 7091874. PMID 32219187.
- Mordecai, Erin A.; Caldwell, J. M.; Grossman, M. K.; Lippi, C. A.; Johnson, L. R.; Neira, M.; Rohr, Jason R. (October 2019). "Thermal biology of mosquito-borne disease". Ecology Letters. 22 (10): 1690–1708. Bibcode:2019EcolL..22.1690M. doi:10.1111/ele.13335. hdl:10919/105221. PMC 6744319. PMID 31286630.
- Cohen, J. M.; Sauer, E. L.; Santiago, O.; Spencer, S.; Rohr, J. R. (30 October 2020). "Divergent impacts of warming weather on wildlife disease risk across climates". Science. 370 (6519) eabb1702. doi:10.1126/science.abb1702. PMC 8588056. PMID 33214248.
- Rohr, Jason R.; Sack, Austin; Bakhoum, Souleymane; Barrett, Christopher B.; Lopez-Carr, David; Chamberlin, Adam J.; Wolfe, Noah (20 July 2023). "A planetary health innovation for disease, food and water challenges in Africa". Nature. 619 (7971): 782–787. doi:10.1038/s41586-023-06333-0 (inactive 19 July 2025).
- Mahon, Michael B.; Sack, Alexandra; Aleuy, Alejandro; Barbera, Carly; Brown, Ethan; Buelow, Heather; Civitello, David J.; Rohr, Jason R. (11 April 2024). "A meta-analysis on global change drivers and the risk of infectious disease". Nature. 629 (8013): 830–836. Bibcode:2024Natur.629..830M. doi:10.1038/s41586-024-07380-6. PMID 38720068.
