= The Jesus Generation (album) =

Studio album by Forrest Frank
- Released: December 4, 2026
- Label: River House
- Producers: Forrest Frank; Axe Williams; D. Mills; Malachi O'Connor; Jordan Padilla; Josh Holiday; Pera Krstajić

Forrest Frank chronology
Jesus Is Alive (Vol. 1) (2026)	The Jesus Generation (2026)

Singles from The Jesus Generation
- 1. "Okay!" Released: May 3, 2026; 2. "Jesus Is Alive!" Released: May 8, 2026

Alternative cover
- Exclusive CD and LP cover variant

The Jesus Generation (Note: Stylized in all caps) is the upcoming ninth studio album by the American contemporary Christian musician Forrest Frank. The album is scheduled for release on December 4, 2026, through River House Records. Its twenty tracks were primarily written and produced by Frank himself, containing additional production credits from Axe Williams, D. Mills, Malachi O'Connor, Jordan Padilla, Josh Holiday, and Pera Krstajić, and additional writing credits from Krstajić. It contains guest appearances from Jonathan Pokluda, KB, Lecrae, Jvke, Zvc, Michael W. Smith, Lost & Found, and Elevation Rhythm. The album is thematically a "social commentary on the country's current spiritual revival."

The Jesus Generation was supported with the release of two preceding singles. "Okay!", the album's lead single, was released on May 3, 2026, and reached number 22 on the Billboard Bubbling Under Hot 100 Singles chart and number 4 on the Hot Christian Songs chart. "Jesus Is Alive!", the album's second single, was released on May 8, 2026, and peaked at number 8 on the Bubbling Under Hot 100 Singles chart, as well as topping the Hot Christian Songs chart. The album was also promoted by three promotional singles, including "What a Life" on October 30, 2026, "Go! Go! Go!" on November 6, 2026, "My Little Miracle" on November 13, 2026, and "New Season" on November 20, 2026. "What a Life" peaked at number 10 on the Billboard Hot Christian Songs chart, and "Go! Go! Go!" peaked at number 29.

The Jesus Generation was promoted with Frank's headling Jesus Generation Tour, which featured guest acts Tori Kelly, Cory Asbury, and the Figs, and reached 29 locations within the United States. Selling 500,000 tickets within the first half-month of announcement and later drawing an audience of 519,000 people, the tour set attendance records at several arenas and has been recognized as the most successful tour of Christian music to date. An eponymous tour documentary, created in collaboration with Lionsgate and Kingdom Story Company, is scheduled for release in 2027.

== Release and promotion ==
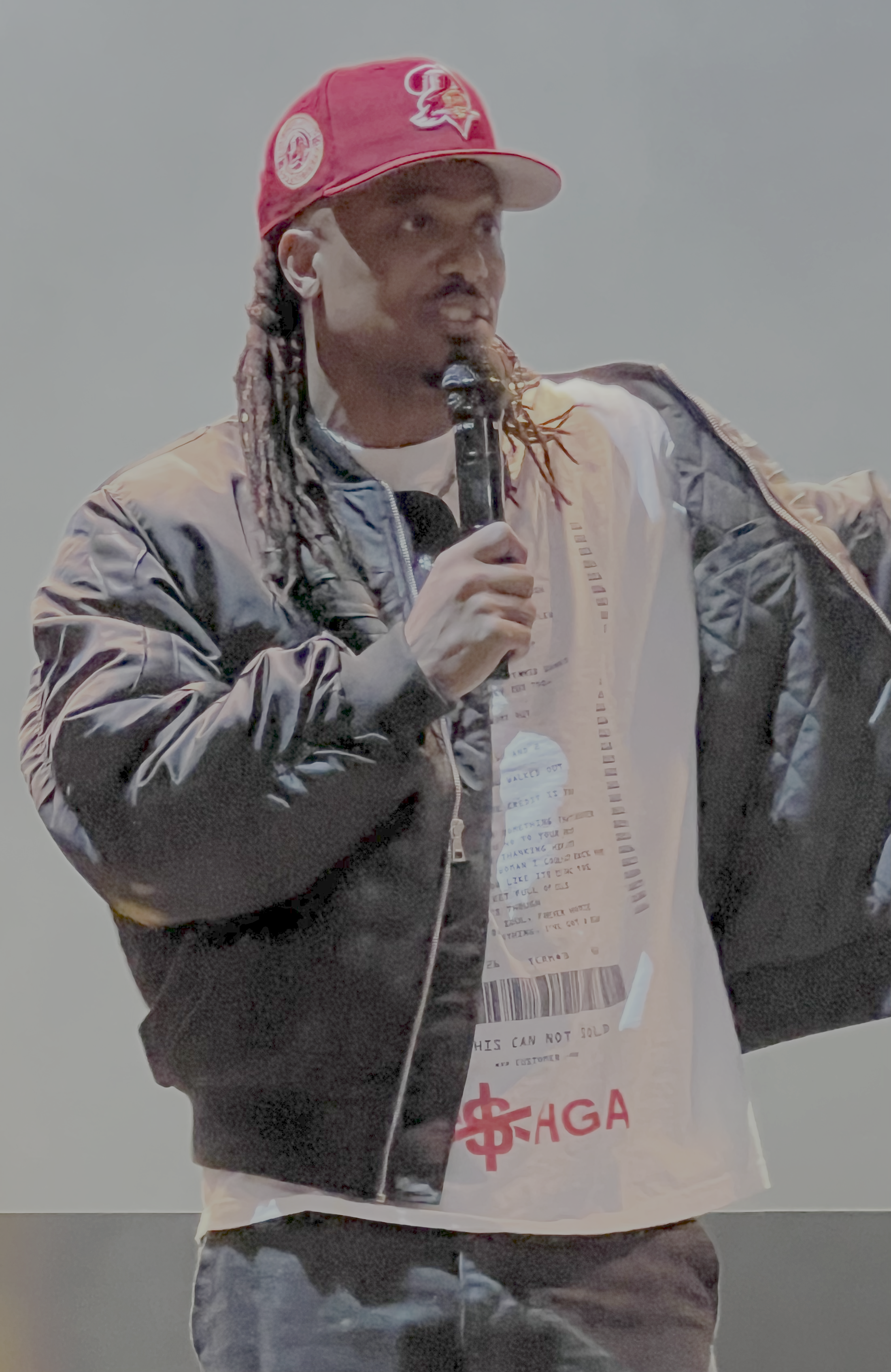
KB (pictured in 2026) appears on "Go! Go! Go!", the second promotional single from The Jesus Generation.

The lead single from The Jesus Generation, "Okay!", was released on May 3, 2026. Frank wrote the song over livestreaming on Instagram. On June 29, 2026, the song was released to Christian radio in the United States. In late April 2026, Frank began releasing teasers for "Jesus Is Alive!" to social media platforms. Seeing the song's success, he launched a promotional campaign in which he challenged other performers — primarily independent Christian musicians — to participate in recording an original rap verse or producing a remix of song. The campaign was a success, attracting attention from both secular musicians as well as Christian musicians. On May 8, 2026, the song was released as the second single from The Jesus Generation. Its release was promoted with the release of a lyric video, which was uploaded to YouTube.

On October 28, 2026, Frank announced through social media the release of the upcoming album, and it was announced that a preceding single from the album would be released on October 30. Early teasers of the album's tracks revealed which collaborators would give guest appearances on the album, and Frank sought advice on social media as to which tracks should be released ahead of the full album. Of the nine tracks teased, those selected were "What a Life", released as a promotional single on October 30, 2026, "Go! Go! Go!", on November 6, 2026, "My Little Miracle" on November 13, 2026, and "New Season" on November 20, 2026. With the release of the "Go! Go! Go!", The Jesus Generation was made available for pre-order. A lyric video, uploaded to YouTube, was released in promotion of each of the four tracks.

== Tour ==
In promotion of The Jesus Generation, Frank headlined the supporting Jesus Generation Tour in affiliation with TPR, which featured guest acts Tori Kelly, Cory Asbury, and The Figs. Beginning on June 1, 2026, at the BOK Center in Tulsa, Oklahoma, and lasting until August 1, at the Globe Life Field in Arlington, Texas, the tour visited 29 locations within the United States. It was first announced in December 2025; tickets and VIP packages were made available for an exclusive presale at Frank's website beginning on December 10, and on December 12 were made available to the general public. Visiting several arenas and stadiums, the tour would mark Frank's most amibitious headlining tour, and his first headlining outdoor in-the-round stadium tour. The Jesus Generation Tour was Frank's third headlining tour overall.

=== Reception ===
The Jesus Generation Tour was a commercial success. Jonathan Roberts, speaking to Billboard on behalf of the United Talent Agency, claimed that it was "the most in-demand tour in Christian music history," and both CCM Magazine and Crosswalk have commended it as the biggest Christian music tour in history, drawing an audience of over 519,000 attendees. An estimated 50,000 audience members were converted to Christianity during live performances on the tour. The tour was significantly more successful than previous headlining tours of Frank's; his Child of God Tour in 2024 and Child of God Tour Part 2 in 2025 saw a total attendance of 48,246 and 214,626, respectively.

Many tickets sold within the presale, and within ten days of its announcement the tour had already sold 470,000 tickets. The tour ultimately drew an audience of 519,000 attendees. Many of the tour's venus sold-out within days of announcement, and several venues set attendance records. Each location drew an average of over 17,000 audience members, while some saw as many as 35,000. United Talent Agency's Jeffrey Hasson attributed the tour's success to Frank's ability to "[connect] with a generation of fans" and appear "at the forefront of a cultural moment that is very special and very rare," and the tour's success has also lent itself to his attraction of various ages and demographics.

== Film ==
In October 2026, Frank announced through Instagram that he, in partnership with Lionsgate and Kingdom Story Company, would be releasing a documentary film, containing live performances and behind-scenes-footage from the tour. Similarly titled The Jesus Generation, the film is scheduled for release to theatres in 2027. Although a director and specific release date had not yet been announced, it was announced that the film would feature appearances from Rick Rubin, Philip Anthony Mitchell, and Sadie Robertson Huff. A trailer was released in promotion of the film.

== Commercial performance ==
"Okay!" received notable success early-on; within the ten days prior to its release, teasers for the song had accumulated 50 million views on social media platforms. Within its first charting week, the song debuted at number 14 on the Billboard Hot Christian Songs chart and entered the Digital Song Sales chart at number 11. On October 3, 2026 it reached its peak at number 4 on the former. On September 5, the song entered the Billboard Bubbling Under Hot 100 Singles chart at number 25, and on September 19 peaked at number 22. On the Christian Airplay chart the song reached number 7. The song also received international success; in Australia it peaked at number 4 on Today's Christian Music's Australian Christian Airplay chart.

"Jesus Is Alive!" debuted at number 17 on the Billboard Hot Christian Songs chart. The following week, the song entered the Bubbling Under Hot 100 Singles chart at number 8 and the Digital Song Sales chart at number 13, and rose to top the Hot Christian Songs chart. The song's success marked Frank's second leader on the chart, following "Your Way's Better" in 2025. The sixteen-position jump led "Jesus Is Alive!" to tie alongside Reba McEntire and Lauren Daigle's "Back to God", MercyMe's "I Can Only Imagine", and Daigle's "You Say" as the biggest jump to the top position in the history of the Hot Christian Songs chart. The rise is due in majority to streaming support; the track saw a 199% increase in streams for that week.

Two of the album's promotional singles, "What a Life" and "Go! Go! Go!", both debuted at their peak positions on the Billboard Hot Christian Songs chart, with "What a Life" reaching number 10 and "Go! Go! Go!" reaching number 29.

== Track listing ==
All songs stylized in all caps.

The Jesus Generation track listing
No.	Title	Lyrics	Music	Producer	Length
1.	"Somebody Told Somebody" (featuring Jonathan Pokluda)
2.	"God Dream"
3.	"Best Day Ever"
4.	"Adventure"
5.	"What a Life"	Frank; Pera Krstajić	Frank; Krstajić	Frank; Krstajić	2:37
6.	"Praise Party"
7.	"Go! Go! Go!" (featuring KB and Lecrae)	Frank; Kevin Burgess; Lecrae Moore; Krstajić	Frank; Burgess; Moore; Krstajić	Frank; Krstajić	3:30
8.	"Work Out"
9.	"Today"
10.	"Real Life"
11.	"Malachi 4:6"
12.	"Let the Light In" (featuring Jvke)
13.	"Okay!"	Axe Williams; D. Mills; Frank; Malachi O'Connor	Frank	Frank; Williams; Mills; O'Connor; Jordan Podilla; Josh Holiday	2:56
14.	"Smile"
15.	"My Little Miracle" (featuring Zvc)	Frank; Joy Elizabeth Bennett	Frank	Frank; Krstajić^{[a]}	2:51
16.	"Glory Hallelujah" (featuring Michael W. Smith)
17.	"Jesus Is Alive!" (featuring Lost & Found)	Frank	Frank	Frank	2:08
18.	"New Season"	Frank	Frank	Frank	4:24
19.	"Ruined for Ordinary"
20.	"Revival's in the Air" (featuring Elevation Rhythm)

=== Notes ===
- ^{^[a]} indicates an additional producer.

== Release history ==
Release history and formats for The Jesus Generation
Region	Date	Format(s)	Label(s)
Various	December 4, 2026	CD; LP; cassette; digital download; streaming	River House Records
