= Barstool conservatism =

Political tendency in the United States

Barstool conservatism is a name for a variety of political conservatism in the United States, associated with Dave Portnoy, founder and CEO of the Barstool Sports digital media empire, and his audience of "stoolies", made up primarily of younger men. The term was coined by journalist Matthew Walther.

In general, it supports Donald Trump, and combines an opposition to COVID-19 lockdowns and to bans on abortion, with an "unwillingness to accept liberal social norms", such as "gender pronoun usage and diversity, equity and inclusion practices", and embraces "sexual libertinism, anti-authoritarianism, ... and lots of f-bombs".

As of November 2022, some have alleged barstool conservatism to be "growing in prominence", and even to be "largely" defining the Republican Party coalition. By 2024 barstool conservatism was credited with helping Donald Trump win the election. Others complained it lacked "a clear, animating political vision", and warned its embrace of recreational drugs and gambling would inevitably lead to a backlash when their social effects were felt.

== Usage ==
One early use of the phrase came from journalist Matthew Walther who, shortly after Trump's 2017 inauguration, described the group of voters that Trump appealed to and who would influence the Republican Party after he was gone, as "barstool conservatives". He described them as having a streak at odds with Republican Christian "traditional social conservatives"—they did "not oppose or even care about abortion or same-sex marriage, much less stem-cell research"; but instead accepted "with varying degrees of enthusiasm .... pornography, homosexuality, drug use, legalized gambling, and whatever GamerGate was about"; but do side with conservatives in having "vague concerns about political correctness and 'SJWs', opposition to the popularization of so-called critical race theory, sentimentality about the American flag and the military, the rights of male undergraduates to engage in fornication while intoxicated without fear of the Title IX mafia." Reporter Robert Silverman also used the term "Barstool Republicans".

Writing in November 2022, Benjamin Schnurr, describes Barstool, or at least Dave Portnoy's ideas, as "a mixture of politically incorrect and, at times, misogynistic behavior" with "more liberal stances on issues such as women's and LGBTQ rights". Some other descriptions of barstool conservatism are: "horny-bro aesthetic that embraces sports, sex and generally letting 'you do you' (provided you avoid making him do pretty much anything)" (Jane Coaston); the meeting of "frat culture and cultural conservatism" (Eumenes of Cardia).

=== Place in the conservative coalition ===
The traditional American conservative/Republican Party coalition was said to be analogous to a "stool", needing "three legs", namely,

- "social conservatives" seeking to "uphold traditional values and hierarchies", particularly religious ones like banning abortion (i.e. "theocons");
- "libertarians" promoting "small government and free market capitalism", particularly low taxes;
- "foreign policy hawks" advocating for "an active and at times aggressive foreign policy approach", particularly containment of communism (i.e. "neocons").

The integration of these three currents was known as Fusionism. Analogues of "barstool conservatives" were not part of this coalition but gained ground by the 2020s. With the end of the Cold War, the last leg of foreign policy "declined significantly", and by the 2020s religious belief in America had declined, suggesting a diminished importance for the first leg, and low tax, small-government conservatism also reportedly lost support.

In the words of Derek Robertson of Politico, when Trump "dismantled that old fusion" of free-market economic enthusiasm and "country-club traditionalism, Barstool was ready." In this new era, Trump was able "to mobilize a varied group of constituencies", particularly barstoolers and social conservatives, who shared "a resentment for new liberal social norms". Matthew Walther and Rod Dreher, alongside Matthew Schmitz, argue that though traditionalists and non-religious "will never agree", they can "ally" with each other, to form a new conservative coalition against "woke utopianism" that is claimed to be ascendant in the Democratic Party. Schnurr thinks it remains to be seen whether the conservative cultural grievances of "stoolies" with microaggressions and political correctness will overcome its streak for keeping abortion legal, which is a major issue for Portnoy.

==== Relationship with libertarianism ====
The association of aspects of barstool conservatism with libertarianism has proved controversial with conservative libertarians and paleolibertarians. Bonnie Kristian, writing for The Week, said "whatever we call this new libertinism in the GOP, libertarians had nothing to do with it".

== Politicians and campaigns ==
Examples of the strength of barstool conservatism in the Republican Party according to Derek Robertson are, Madison Cawthorn, Matt Gaetz, Lauren Boebert, and Donald Trump. Another example is former New York Republican congressman George Santos (the first openly LGBT member elected to Congress as a non-incumbent Republican).

=== Support for Donald Trump ===
Robertson credits a 200 word long blog post by Portnoy in August 2015 with the birth of the barstool Republican. He said:

“I am voting for Donald Trump. I don’t care if he's a joke. I don't care if he’s racist. I don't care if he's sexist. I don't care about any of it. I hope he stays in the race and I hope he wins. Why? Because I love the fact that he is making other politicians squirm. I love the fact he says shit nobody else will say, regardless of how ridiculous it is.”

In the 2024 election, Donald Trump's success in appealing to "vice voters" was seen as having "helped propel" him to victory. Vice voters were described as a predominantly young male voting bloc associated with Barstool Conservatism whose voting decisions are perceived as based on candidates' support for online gambling, drug legalization, and cryptocurrency (activities often described as vices).

Charles Fain Lehman, a fellow at the Manhattan Institute and a contributing editor of City Journal, wrote in The New York Times that a "backlash" in public opinion against vice is inevitable, as it is only a matter of time before the addictive, medical and psychological side effects of drugs, and the incidents of bankruptcy and ruined credit from gambling and speculation in cryptocurrency, become apparent.

== See also ==
- Calendargate, 2023 controversy seen as pitting Barstool conservatives against social conservatives
- Conservatism in the United States
- Dirtbag left
- Factions in the Republican Party
- Libertarian conservatism
- Libertarianism in the United States
- Libertarian Republican
- Progressive conservatism
- South Park Republican, a similar trend, emerging 20 years prior
- Trumpism
