= Kelce Jam =

Kelce Jam is an annual music and entertainment festival created by Travis Kelce and Medium Rare. Launched in 2023, the event occurs at Azura Amphitheater in Kansas City, combining music, sports, and local culture.

== Overview ==
The first Kelce Jam event occurred on April 28, 2023, at the Azura Amphitheater in Kansas City, coinciding with the NFL Draft Weekend, attended by over 20,000 individuals. It was started with a partnership with the NFL Player Travis Kelce and the event management company Medium Rare to celebrate Kansas City’s community, offering a platform where sports, music, and local culture intersect. The event featured a lineup of artists, including Machine Gun Kelly, Rick Ross, and Loud Luxury.

On May 18, 2024, the festival returned with an expanded lineup that included Lil Wayne, Diplo, and 2 Chainz. The 2024 festival also attracted more than 20,000 fans in person and over one million viewers through a live stream. In addition, it included a special appearance by Kelce's Super Bowl teammate, Patrick Mahomes, and different activities, such as a chicken wing-eating contest.
