= Gronk Beach =

American annual music festival

Gronk Beach is an American annual music festival created and hosted by former professional American football player Rob Gronkowski in partnership with production company Medium Rare. The event has featured performances from artists such as Rick Ross, Flo Rida, Kaskade, The Chainsmokers, and Diplo.

== History ==
=== 2020 - Gronk Beach (Miami) ===
In 2019, Gronkowski announced the first iteration of the event would be held at Miami Beach on the same weekend as Super Bowl LIV. The event was eventually held at Miami Beach’s North Beach Bandshell on February 1, 2020. It featured performances from artists such as Flo Rida, Rick Ross, and Diplo. Celebrities such as Bill Belichick and Mojo Rawley were in attendance at the event.

=== 2020 - Shaq’s Fun House vs. Gronk Beach (Virtual) ===
Gronkowski also collaborated with former basketball player Shaquille O’Neal and Medium Rare on Shaq’s Fun House vs. Gronk Beach, a virtual live-streamed event marketed as a crossover between Gronk Beach and Medium Rare’s other music festival, Shaq’s Fun House. Artists such as DaBaby, Snoop Dogg, and Steve Aoki performed at the event. Proceeds from the event were donated to NAACP Empowerment Programs and the Boys and Girls Clubs of America. The event went on to win a Webby Awards and a Webby People’s Voice Award in the category “Sports, General Virtual & Remote.”

=== 2022 - Gronk Beach (Las Vegas) ===
Gronkowski and Medium Rare collaborated with Wynn Nightlife to organize the 2022 iteration of Gronk Beach at the Wynn Las Vegas’s Encore Beach Club. The event was held on April 29, 2022 and took place concurrently with the 2022 NFL Draft. Its lineup included The Chainsmokers, Kim Lee, DJ Five, and the Deux Twins. The event also featured an on-stage appearance from Gronkowski’s girlfriend, model and actress Camille Kostek. Russell Westbrook, Travis Kelce, and Julian Edelman were in attendance.

=== 2025 - Gronk Beach (Las Vegas) ===
The 2025 edition was the third held in Las Vegas, and featured similar celebrity appearances as previous editions, as well as Flo Rida.
