= Marilyn Laverty =

American publicist and entrepreneur

- Born: New Jersey
- Education: BA, Philosophy
- Alma mater: Cornell University
- Occupations: Founder and CEO, Shore Fire Media
- Years active: 1977–present
- Website: www.shorefire.com

Marilyn Laverty is an American public relations executive and entrepreneur. She is the chair of Shore Fire Media, a public relations company she founded in 1990, and a senior advisor to its parent company, Dolphin Entertainment.

Among others, she has represented Carole King, Kenny Chesney, Zac Brown Band, Norah Jones, Mavis Staples, Lana Del Rey and St. Vincent. She has worked with Bruce Springsteen since 1980.

Laverty grew up in Southern New Jersey. She attended Cornell University and graduated with a degree in philosophy in 1976. Her first jobs were as an editorial assistant at the Ithaca Journal and a freelance writer for US and UK music magazines.

She began her career in PR as an assistant at Columbia Records in 1977. She worked briefly at RCA, and returned to Columbia in 1979. She left the label 11 years later as VP and head of publicity.

Laverty founded Shore Fire Media in1990 in Brooklyn Heights and subsequently opened offices in Nashville and Los Angeles. The company was acquired by Dolphin Entertainment in 2019. In 2026, she transitioned from CEO to chair of Shore Fire and became a senior advisor to Dolphin.
