= Guy's Flavortown Tailgate =

Guy’s Flavortown Tailgate, abbreviated as GFT, is an annual event hosted by the American chef Guy Fieri in partnership with Medium Rare. Held during the Super Bowl weekend, it debuted in 2023 and offers fans a free tailgating experience featuring food, music, and festivities.

== Overview ==
The inaugural Guy's Flavortown Tailgate occurred on February 12, 2023, in Glendale, Arizona, near the Super Bowl stadium. It was started with the partnership between the American chef Guy Fieri and the event management company Medium Rare. It was sponsored by several companies and brands, including CashApp and Pepsi. The event welcomed over 20,000 fans and featured culinary creations inspired by Fieri’s “Flavortown” brand. Food offerings included selections from local vendors, food trucks, and pop-up restaurants, with live performances by Diplo and Locash.

In 2024, the event moved to Las Vegas, coinciding with the Super Bowl held there. Located at the LINQ High Roller, it attracted another 20,000 fans, offering over 20 food pop-ups, including concepts from Fieri's "Diners, Drive-Ins, and Dives." It became the biggest tailgate of Super Bowl Weekend, with entertainment including performances by Dustin Lynch and Diplo and special appearances by celebrities such as Eli Manning and Gordon Ramsay.
