= What a Life (Forrest Frank song) =

Promotional single by Forrest Frank

from the album The Jesus Generation
- Released: October 30, 2026
- Genre: Christian
- Length: 2:37
- Label: River House
- Songwriters: Forrest Frank; Pera Krstajić
- Producers: Frank; Krstajić

Forrest Frank singles chronology
"2 Step the Enemy" (2026)	"What a Life" (2026)	"Go! Go! Go!" (2026)

Lyric video
- "What a Life" on YouTube

"What a Life" (Note: Stylized in all caps) is a song by the American contemporary Christian musician Forrest Frank. The song was released on November 6, 2026, via River House Records, as the first of three promotional singles from Frank's ninth studio album, The Jesus Generation. The song was both written and produced by Frank alongside Pera Krstajić. It peaked at number 10 on the Billboard Hot Christian Songs chart.

== Release ==
Upon the announcement of Frank's upcoming ninth studio album, The Jesus Generation, he teased through Instagram portions of several tracks that were anticipated to appear on the album. Frank sought advice on social media of which tracks he would release ahead of the full album, and settled upon "What a Life" as one. The song was released, and followed by two more songs by selected by the same means, including "Go! Go! Go!" on November 6, 2026, "My Little Miracle" on November 14, 2026, and "New Season" on November 20, 2026.

"What a Life" was officially released on Ocotober 30, 2026, through River House Records, as the first of the three promotional singles from the album. Upon release, the song was promoted with the release of an official lyric video, which was uploaded to YouTube.

== Composition ==
Running for a duration of 2 minutes and 37 seconds, "What a Life" is primarily a contemporary Christian song, containing elements of pop and R&B. Shore Fire described the song as a "feel-good anthem of thanks," and Niagara Frontier Publications made note of its "jazzy horns and infectious pop melodies." Lyrically, the song has been inspired by a boy experiencing cancer, which "ended in a miracle" according to a post made by Frank to Facebook.

== Commercial performance ==
"What a Life" made its chart debut on November 14, 2026, where it opened at its peak position of number 10 on the Billboard Hot Christian Songs chart.

== Personnel ==
Credits adapted from Apple Music.

- Amanda Bradshaw – choir
- Andrew Keller – engineer
- Forrest Frank – producer, writer, programmer, vocals
- Grace Pehrman – choir
- Ilija Mihailovic – choir
- Jacob "Biz" Morris – mixing, masterer
- Ognjen Gotovcevic – saxophone
- Pera Krstajić – producer, writer, programmer
- Tyler Christian Lewis – choir

== Charts ==
Chart performance for "What a Life"
Chart (2026)	Peak position
US Hot Christian Songs (Billboard)	10

== Release history ==
Release history and formats for "What a Life"
Region	Date	Format(s)	Label(s)
Various	October 30, 2026	Digital download; streaming	River House Records
Various	December 4, 2026	CD; LP; cassette; digital download; streaming; (with The Jesus Generation)	River House Records
