= Dave Portnoy =

American entrepreneur (born 1977)

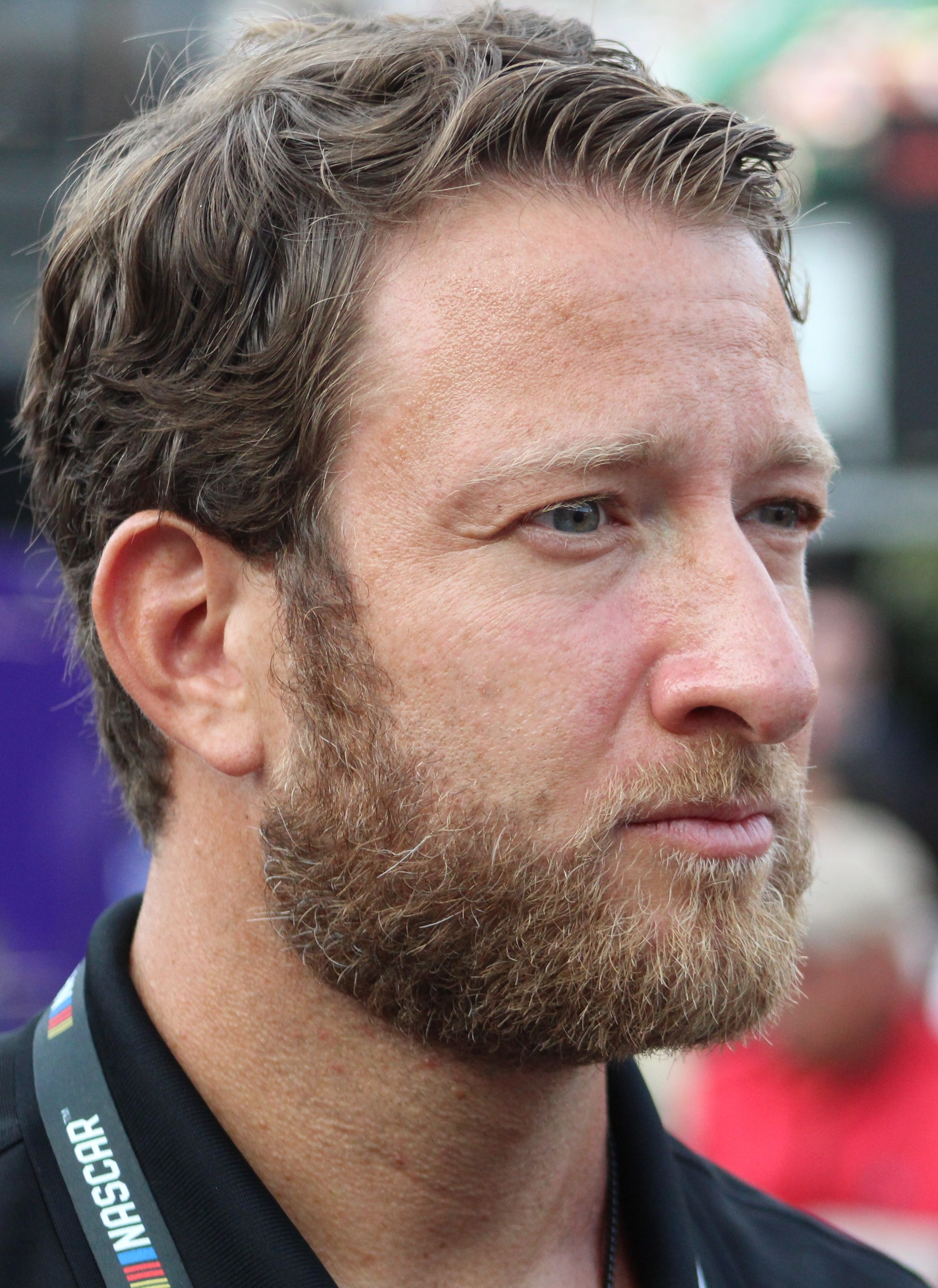
- Portnoy at Bristol Motor Speedway in 2019
- Born: David Scott Portnoy; March 22, 1977 (age 49); Salem, Massachusetts, U.S.
- Education: University of Michigan
- Occupations: Businessman; social media personality
- Years active: 2003–present
- Employer: Barstool Sports
- Spouse: Renee Satterthwaite (m. 2009; sep. 2017)
- Website: barstoolsports.com

David Scott Portnoy (born March 22, 1977) is an American businessman and social media personality. He is the founder and owner of sports and popular culture company Barstool Sports.

== Early life and education ==
David Scott Portnoy was born on March 22, 1977 in Salem, Massachusetts, and raised in nearby Swampscott, the son of Michael, a lawyer, and Linda, a high school teacher. He is Jewish. He attended Swampscott High School, where he played on the school's baseball team, winning the league batting triple crown as a junior. One of his friends and classmates was ESPN's Todd McShay, who was born in the same hospital on the same day as Portnoy.

Portnoy graduated from the University of Michigan in 1999 with a degree in education, though he had no plans to become a teacher. While at Michigan, Portnoy founded thegamblingman.com, a website where he published his sports betting picks.

== Career ==
=== Barstool Sports ===
After college, Portnoy moved to Boston and began working at Yankee Group, an IT market research firm. Portnoy, a self-described "degenerate gambler," bet heavily on sports, losing $30,000 one year of his mid-twenties. In 2004, Portnoy left the Yankee Group and founded Barstool Sports. The early iteration of Barstool was a four-page sports newspaper that Portnoy handed out on subway platforms and street corners in Boston. The paper was meant to appeal to young men and rejected political correctness. Early advertisers in the newspaper included offshore betting websites such as partypoker, which was operating in the United States illegally. The contents of the newspaper was originally solely written by Portnoy, but freelance writers, including Todd McShay, joined the paper. At first, the paper struggled, but gained traction in 2004 when Portnoy began placing photos of women in bikinis on the front page of the newspaper. In 2007, Barstool expanded to a blog.

Portnoy gradually cultivated his persona as "El Presidente", a blunt and candid character. His writing was well-received among young men and the publication subsequently became a mainstay of bro culture. Peter Chernin's The Chernin Group purchased a majority stake of Barstool in January 2016. In 2020, Penn Entertainment purchased a 36% stake in Barstool Sports for $163 million, including $135 million in cash and $28 million in Penn non-voting convertible preferred stock. Penn acquired the remainder of the company in February 2023 for $388 million. Portnoy re-purchased Barstool in August 2023 for one dollar, non-compete agreements in the gambling space, and a clause that if Barstool were to be sold again Penn Entertainment would take 50%.

The "Dave Portnoy Show with Eddie & Co." was a podcast hosted by Dave Portnoy and Eddie Farrer that aired on Barstool Sports. In October 2022, the show was placed on indefinite hiatus after Portnoy said that the show had become "terrible" and lacked fresh content. Following the failure of the revived Barstool Radio, Portnoy announced the launch of "The Unnamed Show" in January 2024, along with Ryan Whitney and Kirk Minihane.

Portnoy is the founder and rules commissioner for the Internet Invitational, a YouTube golf event mainly for golf influencers, which first aired between October and November 2025 and has garnered over 25 million views on the Youtube platform.

==== Labor relations ====
In 2019, in response to employees of The Ringer trying to start a union, Portnoy tweeted a threat to fire any employee at his blogging company who sought advice on forming a union. The New York State Department of Labor released a statement saying, "We say no way, no how to intimidation, threats and union busting. It is illegal to take any unfavorable action—including termination—against employees for union-related activities under the National Labor Relations Act. New York is a proud union state." U.S. Representative Alexandria Ocasio Cortez tweeted in response to Portnoy, "If you're a boss tweeting firing threats to employees trying to unionize, you are likely breaking the law & can be sued, in your words, 'on the spot.' ALL workers in the US have the protected freedom to organize for better conditions." The National Labor Relations Board investigated Portnoy in 2019 for threatening to fire his workers if they unionized. That December, Portnoy reached an informal settlement with the Board, which required him to delete his threatening tweets and remove any potential anti-union material created by Barstool Sports. The settlement also noted that the Twitter account originally encouraging employees to unionize was actually owned by Barstool in an attempt to out labor organizers. Portnoy also released a T-shirt with his face on it that read "Union Buster".

==== Fox Sports partnership ====
On July 17, 2025, Portnoy announced on his X account that Barstool Sports was entering into a "wide-ranging partnership" with Fox Sports. As part of the deal, Portnoy will become an analyst on Fox's Big Noon Kickoff college football pregame show.

=== Pizza reviews ===
One Bite Pizza Reviews is an internet show by Portnoy, in which he reviews pizza from restaurants around the world, ranking it on a scale of 0–10. Portnoy began his show with the goal of reviewing every pizza place in Manhattan in 2017. In addition to Portnoy, some reviews feature celebrity guests. Portnoy rarely ranks a pizza above 9.0, but some of those he praised have experienced a transformative growth in popularity, going "viral, becoming a can't-miss attraction for legions of young, loud, and often inebriated Barstool diehards."

In 2019, Portnoy appeared in the documentary Pizza A Love Story where he first declared New Haven the "Pizza Capital of the United States." Two years later he tweeted "The pizza capital of the United States is New Haven, CT. Anybody who says otherwise is wrong."

In October 2023, The New York Times called Portnoy "one of the most influential people in the world of food social media," with the ability to "change the fate of a pizzeria with a single utterance."

In August 2023, Portnoy was involved in an altercation with Charlie Redd, the owner of Dragon Pizza in Somerville, Massachusetts, after criticizing the pizzeria's pizza as "a floppy mess." Portnoy and Redd then entered into an expletive-laden exchange.

Portnoy and Barstool Sports hosted the first One Bite Pizza Festival in September 2023 in Brooklyn, New York. The One Bite Pizza Festival is a joint-venture with Medium Rare. For the second year of the festival, Portnoy donated all proceeds from the festival to Al Santillo, the owner of Santillo's Brick Oven Pizza, which had burned down earlier in the year. A GoFundMe campaign started by Portnoy raised more than $32,000 to help with rebuilding Santillo's.

== Politics ==
Portnoy's popularity and influence, specifically in politics, has been referred to as Barstool conservatism. He identifies as "socially liberal" and "fiscally conservative". He has been described as a strong supporter of president Donald Trump.

He opposed COVID-19 lockdowns. He said "When did this become...'flatten the curve' to 'we have to find a cure or everyone's going to die?'"

In a 2015 blog post, he said: "I am voting for Donald Trump. I don't care if he's a joke. I don't care if he's racist. I don't care if he's sexist. I don't care about any of it. I hope he stays in the race and I hope he wins. Why? Because I love the fact that he is making other politicians squirm. I love the fact he says shit nobody else will say, regardless of how ridiculous it is." He endorsed Trump for the 2016 United States presidential election. In 2020, he interviewed Trump at the White House. In 2024, he supported and voted for Donald Trump for president.

He criticized the June 2022 Dobbs v. Jackson Women's Health Organization Supreme Court decision, which overturned Roe v. Wade, saying "It makes no sense how anybody thinks it's their right to tell a woman what to do with her body." He said it is "dangerous" to vote for Republicans because they will appoint justices who are too conservative to the Supreme Court of the United States.

In response to the United States government group chat leaks, he called on President Trump to remove Mike Waltz from office, saying it was a "fuck-up of epic proportions."

In April 2025, he criticized tariffs in the second Trump administration saying "Welcome to Orange Monday," on his apolitical "Davey Day Trader" financial livestream after immediately losing $20 million or 15 percent of his net worth in the aftermath of the Liberation Day tariffs. However, he said that he plans to keep supporting Trump calling him "a smart guy." and added "I think they’re smarter than me when it comes to these tariffs. I also think he’s playing a high-stakes game here, I'm gonna roll with him for a couple days, a couple weeks, see how this pans out."

He was reported in June 2025 as discussing Greta Thunberg delivering aid to Gaza on a boat, with him saying: "she’s sailing there … and I hope they hit a fucking missile on her boat. Knock that boat down."

He said in September 2025 that the suspension of Jimmy Kimmel's show due to threats by the Trump appointed FCC Chair over his comments on the assassination of Charlie Kirk was not "cancel culture".

=== 2013 Boston mayoral campaign ===
In 2013, he ran for mayor of Boston after mayor Thomas Menino retired. During the 2013 Boston mayoral election, he identified as a libertarian. After raising more than $17,000 in campaign contributions, he failed to submit enough nomination signatures to qualify for the ballot.

== Personal life ==
=== Relationships ===
Portnoy married Renee Satterthwaite in 2009, and they separated in 2017. Portnoy has stated that he has allowed Renee access to all his money for her allegiance during the early days of Barstool. From March 2021 to November 2023, Portnoy dated Silvana Mojica.

=== Finances ===
In 2004, Portnoy filed for bankruptcy protection after large gambling losses. He owed $59,000 to credit card companies and $18,000 to his father. In January 2020, a tax lien for $11,795 was filed against Portnoy by the United States Securities and Exchange Commission.

In 2019, Portnoy said his net worth was around $100 million, which was before he received his payout from Penn Entertainment.

=== Residences ===
Portnoy owns five personal residences worth a total of $95 million. His purchase of a 5,200 square foot residence in Nantucket for $43 million in 2023 was the highest price ever paid for a residence in the state of Massachusetts. In October 2025 he purchased a record-breaking $27.75 million 10,000 square foot waterfront compound in Islamorada, Florida. In 2021, he bought a 6,000 square foot waterfront house in Miami for $14 million and a 5,700 square foot house in Montauk, New York for $9.8 million. He also bought a residence in Saratoga Springs, New York, a 1,522 sq. ft. house sitting on a 7,402 sq. ft. lot. He bought the house in March, 2023, for $1.4 million.

=== Charitable giving ===
In 2020, Portnoy donated $500,000 to the Barstool Fund, a relief effort for small businesses affected by the COVID-19 pandemic. Through May 2021, the campaign raised over $39 million for 348 businesses. In 2024, Portnoy donated $277,000 to the LifeLine Animal Project, an animal shelter in Atlanta, Georgia. The money was generated from t-shirt, hoodie, and hat sales on the Barstool Sports website themed after Miss Peaches, a dog Portnoy adopted from the shelter. After New York Police Department (NYPD) officer Jonathan Diller was killed on duty in March 2024, Portnoy raised more than $1.5 million for Diller's family, including $750,000 raised through a t-shirt sale on the Barstool Sports website and a $750,000 matching donation from Portnoy. Portnoy led a similar t-shirt sale campaign after Delaware State trooper Cpl. Matthew "Ty" Snook was killed in December 2025, raising nearly $500,000 for the police officer's family.

In May 2025, American alcoholic beverage brand High Noon introduced Lucky One Lemonade, a line of vodka-based canned lemonade, through a partnership with Portnoy and his rescue dog, Miss Peaches. A portion of all sales from the drinks will go to support rescue dogs. Through this partnership, Portnoy and High Noon have a goal to raise $1 million dollars to support rescue animals, by the end of Summer 2025. They have joined with LifeLine Animal Project and Best Friends Animal Society as part of the "Our Pack Gives Back" initiative, running through September 1, 2025.

=== Controversial comments ===
Critics allege that comments posted on Barstool Sports by Portnoy and others normalize rape culture. Comments that have sparked debate include a post on a 2010 blog satirizing an Australian judge, in which Portnoy said "[E]ven though I never condone rape if you're a size 6 and you're wearing skinny jeans you kind of deserve to be raped right?" When confronted with his statement by Lisa Guerrero of Inside Edition, Portnoy said: "Correct. I stand by that. I think it's a funny joke." Guerrero asked, "Do you know how offensive that is?" He responded, "No, I obviously don't."

In 2020, multiple videos of Portnoy surfaced that showed him using the N-word or joking about blackface. Business Insider reported that Portnoy had made multiple "unprovoked, personal attacks online", including frequent "sexually harassing comments" toward Deadspin's Laura Wagner. Portnoy has defended himself from allegations of sexism, saying: "I gave two girls their own radio show. We have hired girl after girl. They say it's a great place to work."

=== NFL-related legal issues ===
Portnoy has twice been detained in NFL-related incidents. On May 12, 2015, he was arrested after he and three Barstool employees handcuffed themselves to each other on the floor of NFL headquarters in Manhattan and demanded to speak with NFL commissioner Roger Goodell to protest Deflategate. He was arrested again in 2019 when he was placed in a holding cell at Mercedes-Benz Stadium for a portion of Super Bowl LIII after creating fake passes to attend a press event the day before. He was prohibited from attending the game.

As of 2026, he has been permitted to attend NFL related events again, including the Super Bowl. As such, he attended the 2026 Super Bowl along with other Barstool Sports employees, featuring the New England Patriots and Seattle Seahawks.

=== Sexual assault allegations ===
In November 2021, a Business Insider exposé alleged that Portnoy had engaged in violent and aggressive sexual encounters with three women and that he had filmed the women without their consent. He claimed the sex was consensual. Portnoy called the article a "hit piece", claiming that Business Insider tried to find evidence of wrongdoing by him for approximately eight months. In February 2022, more sexual assault and harassment claims by young women were published in a second Business Insider article.

On February 7, 2022, Portnoy announced a lawsuit against Business Insider and several of its employees. A federal judge dismissed the lawsuit in November. Portnoy filed an appeal of the dismissal. In February 2023, he dropped his appeal.

== Publications ==
- Sharks Have Feelings Too, David Portnoy, Barstool Sports, Inc., 2016.
- Cancel Me If You Can, Dave Portnoy, Gallery Books, 2026.

== See also ==
- Barstool conservatism
