= Medium Rare (production company) =

Medium Rare is an American event creation and production company. It is known for creating joint venture live events and broadcasts with celebrities including Shaquille O'Neal, Rob Gronkowski, Travis Kelce, Dave Portnoy, Guy Fieri, and Daymond John. It is also known for working with Rob Gronkowski to produce the first NFT created by a professional athlete.

== History ==
Medium Rare was founded by Adam Richman and Joe Silberzweig in 2018. Prior to founding Medium Rare, Silberzweig and Richman worked for event and music festival companies such as SFX, Insomniac, Live Nation, ID&T, and Tomorrowland.

In 2018, Medium Rare collaborated with Shaquille O’Neal to create Shaq's festival - Shaq's Fun House, which featured carnival games, circus performers, and O’Neal performing as a celebrity DJ. The event also featured DJs such as Steve Aoki, A-Trak, Diplo, and Carnage. Medium Rare has produced each iteration of Shaq's Fun House from 2018 until the present.

In 2019, Medium Rare collaborated with Rob Gronkowski to create his own festival - Gronk Beach The first edition took place at Super Bowl Miami in 2019.

Since 2019, Medium Rare has managed DJ Diesel (Shaquille O’Neal's DJ act), and DJ Carnage who has since rebranded as GORDO

In 2020, Medium Rare produced the first Black Entrepreneurs Day in association with Daymond John. The event takes place annually and has featured appearances by black entrepreneurs and celebrities such as: Kevin Hart, Venus Williams, Spike Lee, Tyra Banks, and more.

In March 2021, Medium Rare and Gronkowski released several digital trading cards, featuring Gronkowski's notable Super Bowl moments, as NFTs in 2021. They were the first NFTs created and offered by a professional athlete. Gronkowski's NFTs set records at the time, generating approximately US$2,000,000 and were showcased across major media outlets including CNBC, Forbes, and Saturday Night Live. In May 2021, Medium Rare and The Golden State Warriors created the first NFT offered by a professional sports team.

In 2023 Medium Rare partnered with Guy Fieri to create Guy’s Flavortown Tailgate which became the largest tailgate at the Super Bowl. The event is attended by over 20,000+.

In February 2023, Medium Rare produced four events at Super Bowl weekend in Phoenix, Arizona. These events included Shaquille O'Neal's Shaq's Fun House on Friday night, Rob Gronkwoski's Gronk Beach on Saturday day, Sports Illustrated The Party on Saturday night, and Guy Fieri's Flavortown Tailgate on Sunday afternoon. Over Super Bowl weekend Medium Rare's events welcomed over 30,000 attendees and generated over $10 million in sponsorship revenue. Medium Rare brought these four events back for Super Bowl 2024 in Las Vegas, NV.

On April 28, 2023, Medium Rare launched Kelce Jam in partnership with Travis Kelce. The inaugural Kelce Jam took place at the Azura Amphitheater in Kansas City on NFL Draft weekend. The event featured performers such as Machine Gun Kelly, Rick Ross, Loud Luxury, and others. The event had over 20,000 attendees. The second edition of Kelce Jam took place on May 18, 2024 and featured performers such as Lil Wayne, Diplo, 2 Chainz and more.

On September 23, 2023, Medium Rare launched One Bite Pizza Festival in partnership with Dave Portnoy. The first ever One Bite Pizza Festival took place in New York, NY and featured pizzerias such as: Frank Pepe Pizzeria Napoletana, Sally's, Lucali, and 30+ other notable pizzerias. One Bite Pizza Festival returned in September 2024 and sold out both afternoon & evening session.

In 2024 Medium Rare partnered with B. J. Novak led concept "Chain" and brought ChainFEST to NYC & LA in Fall 2024. ChainFEST is the world's first and largest gourmet chain food festival

== Productions ==
Year	Title	Description	Ref.
2018–2024	Shaq's Fun House	Annual Festival in conjunction with Shaquille O'Neal	
2020–2024	Gronk Beach	Annual festival in conjunction with Rob Gronkowski. Has taken place at Super Bowl weekend and NFL Draft	
2020–2024	Black Entrepreneurs Day	Diversity and Inclusion live stream created in conjunction with Daymond John.	
2023–2024	Kelce Jam	Annual festival in Kansas City created in conjunction with Travis Kelce	
2023–2025	Dave Portnoy's One Bite Pizza Festival	The greatest gathering of pizzerias created in conjunction with Dave Portnoy and Barstool Sports	
2023–2024	Guy Fieri's Flavortown Tailgate	Annual festival in conjunction with Guy Fieri	
2023–2024	Sports Illustrated The Party	Annual Festival in conjunction with Sports Illustrated. Has taken place at Super Bowl weekend.	
2024	ChainFEST	The world's first and largest gourmet chain food festival:	
2020–2021	Sports Illustrated Awards	Awards show	
2020	Shaq's Fun House vs. Gronk Beach	Livestream show featuring Snoop Dogg, DaBaby, and Diplo	
2021	Guy's Restaurant Reboot	Livestream show featuring José Andrés, Marcus Samuelsson, Kane Brown, and Rob Gronkowski.	
