= Bryson Gray =

American rapper (born 1991)

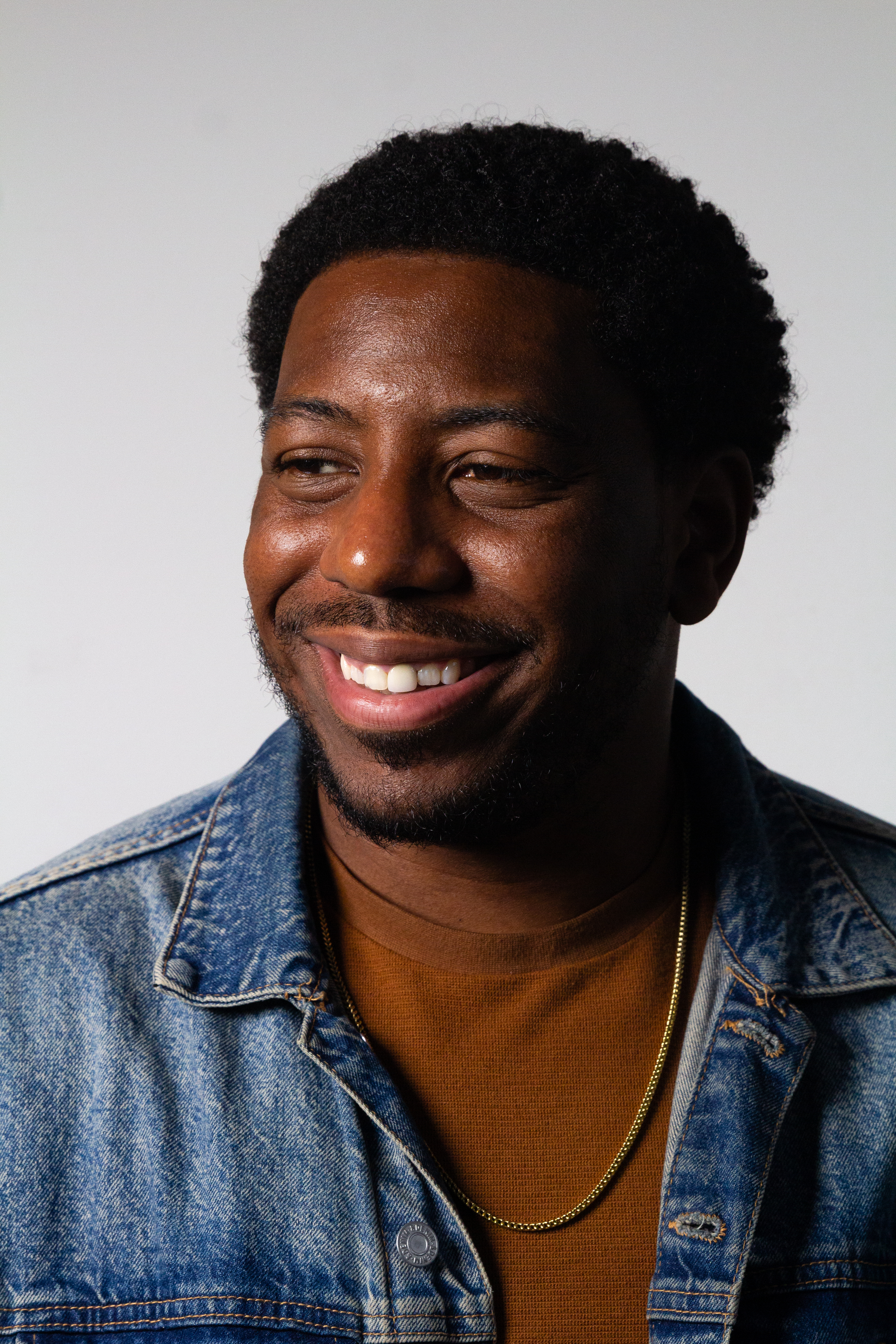
- Gray in 2024
- Born: May 24, 1991 (age 35); High Point, North Carolina, U.S.
- Other names: B.Surius; KingVodka
- Occupations: Rapper; political influencer
- Years active: 2000–present
- Known for: Christian hip-hop; political hip-hop; Southern hip-hop; electropop (early)
- Spouse: Shekinah Gray (m. 2023)

Bryson Gray (born May 24, 1991) is an American rapper, known for his work in the Christian hip-hop and political hip-hop genres. In 2021, his song "Let's Go Brandon", a diss track against President Joe Biden, reached the number one slot on iTunes.

== Career ==
Prior to becoming a Christian rapper, Gray had made snap rap music under the stage name B.Surius, as well as electropop under the alias KingVodka. He first began his music career at 9 years old when he started going to his father's recording studio as a way to become proficient in rapping and producing beats. During high school, he started the snap group 336 Boyz with the assistance of his dad, his cousin and his six friends which included DJ Luke Nasty. Gray was gaining traction in his home state of North Carolina by getting his music played on local radio stations and was even featured on the BET series 106 & Park's Wild Out Wednesday segment with his group on a couple occasions. In 2020, he explained he began putting his political beliefs in his songs after he "redpilled [himself] after going on conservative platforms and trying to debate them".

In October 2021, Gray's upload of his song "Let's Go Brandon" was removed from YouTube for allegedly sharing "false medical information", although the song is still available through numerous reuploads. His Twitter account was temporarily suspended in December 2022 after making comments about Elton John's sexuality. His account was subsequently reinstated after complaints by notable figures such as Jake Shields.

Gray was invited to an interview on the BBC Scotland on a segment in November 2022. The question asked to him was in regard to Kanye West and allegations of West's antisemitism, Gray claimed that he thought the allegations were "without foundation". When asked about Kanye's comments on Jewish people, he began discussing Jewish businessmen Lucian Grainge of Universal Music Group and Michael Lynton of Warner Music Group as proof that Jews controlled the music industry, leading to the host of the radio show ending the call and issuing an apology to viewers.

In 2023, Gray released a song with singer Jimmy Levy and rapper Shemeka Michelle, "Reclaim the Rainbow", which debuted at the top of both R&B/Hip-Hop Digital Song Sales and Rap Digital Song Sales charts for Billboard, as well as number 3 on the iTunes charts.

He was set to perform at the 2023 Lee County, Florida, GOP Lincoln Reagan Dinner, but his performance was allegedly cancelled due to complaints by members that he had been critical of former President Donald Trump in the recent past. In response, he asserted that "Only Trumpers" are "ruining their own agenda" by engaging in cancel culture.

On Christmas Eve of that year, Gray tweeted that the use of Christian imagery in the pin-up-style pictures of young conservative women, some clad in swimwear or lingerie, in "Conservative Dad's Real Conservative Women of America 2024 Calendar" was "demonic". This started Calendargate, a controversy among conservatives online that continued into 2024.

== Personal life ==
Gray has stated that his grandmother was a Black Panther. His father is an English teacher.

Following the January 6 United States Capitol attack, Gray's father Gary took to social media to share that his son, Bryson, had been questioned by the Federal Bureau of Investigation. Bryson retweeted him alleging that they questioned him as a result of people reporting him as a "terrorist".

In an April 2023 documentary short from Vice, he claimed to have been celibate for more than a decade.

Bryson married his wife Shekinah Gray on October 15, 2023. They identify as Messianic Jews.

== Discography ==
=== Studio albums ===
- 2018: My Life Is a Mess: Season 1
- 2018: Genre: No Genre
- 2018: Album About Mariah
- 2020: Maga Ain't Got No Color
- 2020: Maga Szn
- 2020: Can't Cancel God
- 2020: Maga Christmas
- 2021: 1776
- 2021: God Wins
- 2021: Bold as a Lion: Season 1
- 2021: Letters to the Church
- 2022: Us VS the Industry
- 2021: Bars 4 Christ, Vol. 1
- 2022: Lion Music
- 2023: Letters to the Church 2
- 2023: Super Bigot
- 2024: Bryson, the Demon Slayer
- 2024: 777
- 2025: Letters to the Church 3

=== Collaborative albums ===
- 2007: 2 The Point (with 336 Boyz)
- 2008: Club 336 (with 336 Boyz)
- 2010: I Told You So (with 336 Boyz)
- 2012: Full Cups & Empty Bottles (with 336 Boyz)
- 2020: Line in the Sand (with Tyson James)
- 2022: Jan6ers (with Forgiato Blow)
- 2023: Bible Rap (with Don Trochez)
- 2023: Black & White (with Tyson James)

=== EPs ===
- 2014: My Team EP (with 336 Boyz)
- 2018: Album About Fortnite - EP
- 2018: Random Freestyles to Youtube Beats Lol
- 2018: Album About Fortnite, Pt. 2 - EP
- 2019: Big Surius

Singles
Title	Details
Shake 4 Da Money (ft. P-Wonda) (with 336 Boyz)	Released June 1, 2008
Twerk Time (with 336 Boyz)	Released December 24, 2011
Heartbreak & Tequila (with 336 Boyz)	Released January 8, 2012
One More Time (with 336 Boyz)	Released December 3, 2012
My Team (with 336 Boyz)	Released January 27, 2013
Role Model (with 336 Boyz)	Released June 9, 2013
Matter (with 336 Boyz)	Released August 12, 2014
Crazy (ft. LilZa)	Released September 9, 2014
Stranger (ft. Jay Hayden)	Released February 10, 2015
Go Harder (ft. FurchesTwins)	Released May 5, 2015
Feeling Sounds (ft. Will Gittens)	Released November 13, 2015
Everything Is OK (ft. FurchesTwins, B-Wall, Jordan Hunter)	Released October 14, 2016
Slow Down (ft. DJ Luke Nasty)	Released February 3, 2017
Snakes	Released October 27, 2017
Savage (ft. Jay Hayden and DJ Luke Nasty)	Released October 27, 2017
Fuck Alorica	Released February 16, 2018
Maga Boy	Released November 19, 2019
Dog Cage	Released July 10, 2020
Hate Speech	Released October 2, 2020
Maga Party	Released October 30, 2020
Patriots vs Everybody	Released November 6, 2020
Ain't Over Yet	Released November 27, 2020
Bringing God Back	Released November 27, 2020
Game Over	Released November 27, 2020
Maga Forever	Released November 27, 2020
False Teachers	Released December 18, 2020
Menace 2 Society	Released March 26, 2021
I Do Not Comply	Released August 24, 2021
Let's Go Brandon (Joe Biden Diss)	Released October 15, 2021
Thanks, Youtube.	Released November 12, 2021
Maga Icons	Released November 19, 2021
Like Kyle	Released November 22, 2021
Elon Musk	Released April 16, 2022
Ultra Maga (ft. Forgiato Blow, Topher, Tyson James)	Released May 13, 2022
Kanye Was Right	Released May 20, 2022
Run	Released May 27, 2022
Happy	Released June 10, 2022
Kingdom at Hand	Released June 17, 2022
Drag Queens (ft. Alex Stein #99)	Released June 24, 2022
God Save America	Released July 1, 2022
Patriot Anthem (ft. Forgiato Blow)	Released July 8, 2022
Overturned (ft. DC Capital)	Released July 10, 2022
Hunter Biden Hacked (Hunter Biden Diss)	Released July 13, 2022
Gun Control Questions	Released July 15, 2022
Woman of the Year	Released July 22, 2022
Biden Blame Putin	Released July 29, 2022
Liberal World Order	Released August 5, 2022
FBI Raid (ft. Tyson James)	Released August 10, 2022
Jesus (ft. Tyson James)	Released August 19, 2022
Brittney Griner (Brittney Griner Diss)	Released August 26, 2022
Jesus Take the Wheel	Released September 2, 2022
Soul of the Nation	Released September 4, 2022
Ashley's Diary	Released September 9, 2022
Bars for Christ	Released September 16, 2022
Martha's Vineyard	Released September 20, 2022
Evil Rulers	Released September 30, 2022
Remnant Coming (ft. Isaiah Robin & Kieran the Light)	Released October 7, 2022
Alex & Ye	Released October 19, 2022
Fed Up (ft. Forgiato Blow)	Released October 28, 2022
Shut Up and Dribble (LeBron James Diss)	Released November 11, 2022
Bryson 2028	Released November 18, 2022
Burn Balenciaga (Balenciaga Diss)	Released November 28, 2022
Maga Party 24	Released December 7, 2022
Feature with Ye	Released December 15, 2022
Slaying Demons	Released December 23, 2022
Kevin McCarthy (Kevin McCarthy Diss)	Released January 6, 2023
Homemakers	Released March 17, 2023
All of Me	Released March 17, 2023
Cinco de Mayo	Released April 21, 2023
Message to CHH	Released June 7, 2023
Reclaim the Rainbow (ft. Jimmy Levy, Shemeka Michelle)	Released June 16, 2023
All the Way	Released October 6, 2023
Just Got Married	Released October 27, 2023
Fruit	Released October 31, 2023
Way Truth Life	Released November 9, 2023
Gay Demon	Released December 7, 2023
Everybody Get Exposed	Released January 12, 2024

Features
Title	Main Artist	Details
Twenty in the Tank	DJ Luke Nasty	Released May 13, 2016
Fall in Love	Jordan Hunter	Released May 12, 2017; Also featuring LiveLikeDavis
Mt. Rushmore	Rocky Luciano	Released August 11, 2020
Keep on Truckin'	KillWill	Released February 18, 2022
2 Maga	DANRYZ1	Released May 27, 2022; Also featuring Gri!ff The GOP and CarlosRossiMC
Save America	Playboy the Beast	Released June 29, 2022
Votes Overnight	Stoney Dudebro	Released August 23, 2022; Also featuring Forgiato Blow
All My Friends are Shadowbanned	An0maly	Released October 14, 2022
Kyrie Mode	Forgiato Blow	Released November 7, 2022; Also featuring Stoney Dudebro
Gun Totin Bible Thumper	Tyson James	Released May 19, 2023
Cancel Pride	Tyson James	Released June 29, 2023; Also featuring ASAP Preach
Conservative	Bezz Believe	Released July 3, 2023

- Also features Forgiato Blow
