= Jesus Is Alive! =

Single by Forrest Frank

from the album The Jesus Generation
- Released: May 8, 2026
- Genre: Christian hip-hop
- Length: 2:08
- Label: River House Records
- Songwriter: Frank
- Producer: Frank

Forrest Frank singles chronology
"Okay!" (2026)	"Jesus Is Alive!" (2026)	"The Jesus Generation" (2026)

Music video
- "Jesus Is Alive!" (lyrics) on YouTube

"Jesus Is Alive!" is a song by the American Christian musician Forrest Frank. The song was released on May 8, 2026, via River House Records, to digital download and streaming formats. It was written and produced solely by Frank. The song peaked at number 8 on the Billboard Bubbling Under Hot 100 Singles chart and led the Hot Christian Songs chart.

On May 15, 2026, an album titled Jesus Is Alive (Vol. 1) was released, containing the title track, "Jesus Is Alive!", and nineteen additional remixes featuring other musicians. The featured performers on the album are Lost & Found, Kijan Boone, Mike Malagies, 1K Phew, WHATUPRG, Donnie Wahlberg, Vic Lucas, Limoblaze, Jimmy Levy, Marcus Rogers, Zac Lawson, Reagan James Broome, Bryson Gray, Julia Poe, Anike, Brenno, Griffin McCoy, Marissa Berkey, Aftrthght, and Nate Period.

== Background ==
In late April 2026, Frank began releasing teasers for "Jesus Is Alive!" to social media platforms. Seeing the song's success, he launched a promotional campaign in which he challenged other performers — primarily independent Christian musicians — to participate in recording an original rap verse or producing a remix of song. The campaign was a success, attracting attention from both secular musicians as well as Christian musicians. The song was released as a single on May 8, 2026. By the time of its release, the song had already received nineteen million views on social media platforms. Its release was promoted with the release of a lyric video, which was uploaded to YouTube. Frank had, at this point, been noticing remixes of the song which he had wanted to release, and it was suggested to him by Rapzilla that he release a compilation of highlights from the campaign. On May 15, 2026, the full album was released, containing a select nineteen remixes of the song.

== Style ==
"Jesus Is Alive!" primarily demonstrates the genre of Christian hip-hop, and features elements from worship and pop. Timothy Yap of Jubilee Cast made note of its "energetic production" and "bold faith-based message".

== Commercial performance ==
"Jesus Is Alive!", debuted at number 17 on the Billboard Hot Christian Songs chart, supported by an appearance on the Christian Digital Song Sales chart at number 5. The following week, the song entered the Bubbling Under Hot 100 Singles chart at number 8 and the Digital Song Sales chart at number 13. Concurrently, that week it rose to lead the Hot Christian Songs, Christian Digital Song Sales, and Christian Streaming Songs charts. The song's success marked Frank's second leader on the chart, following "Your Way's Better" in 2025.

The sixteen-position jump led "Jesus Is Alive!" to tie alongside Reba McEntire and Lauren Daigle's "Back to God", MercyMe's "I Can Only Imagine", and Daigle's "You Say" as the biggest jump to the top position in the history of the Hot Christian Songs chart. The rise is due in majority to streaming support; the track saw a 199% increase in streams for that week.

== Track listing ==
All tracks are written and produced by Forrest Frank unless otherwise noted.

Jesus Is Alive! track listing
No.	Title	Producer(s)	Length
1.	"Jesus Is Alive!"		2:08
2.	"Okay!"	Axe Williams; D. Mills; Frank; Jordan Padilla; Josh Holiday; Malachi O'Connor	4:35
Total length:			6:43

Jesus Is Alive (Vol. 1) track listing
No.	Title	Length
1.	"Jesus Is Alive" (featuring Lost & Found)	2:56
2.	"Jesus Is Alive" (featuring Kijan Boone)	2:56
3.	"Jesus Is Alive" (featuring Mike Malagies)	2:56
4.	"Jesus Is Alive" (featuring 1K Phew)	2:56
5.	"Jesus Is Alive" (featuring WHATUPRG)	2:56
6.	"Jesus Is Alive" (featuring Donnie Wahlberg)	2:56
7.	"Jesus Is Alive" (featuring Vic Lucas and Limoblaze)	2:29
8.	"Jesus Is Alive" (featuring Jimmy Levy)	2:56
9.	"Jesus Is Alive" (featuring Marcus Rogers)	2:56
10.	"Jesus Is Alive" (featuring Zac Lawson)	2:56
11.	"Jesus Is Alive" (featuring Reagan James Broome)	2:56
12.	"Jesus Is Alive" (featuring Bryson Gray)	2:56
13.	"Jesus Is Alive" (featuring Julia Poe)	2:56
14.	"Jesus Is Alive" (featuring Anike)	2:56
15.	"Jesus Is Alive" (featuring Brenno)	2:36
16.	"Jesus Is Alive" (featuring Griffin McCoy)	2:56
17.	"Jesus Is Alive" (featuring Marissa Berkey)	2:56
18.	"Jesus Is Alive" (featuring Aftrthght)	2:56
19.	"Jesus Is Alive" (featuring Nate Period)	2:56
20.	"Jesus Is Alive"	2:08
Total length:		57:05

== Personnel ==
Credits adapted from Tidal.

- Forrest Frank – producer, writer, vocals
- Jacob "Biz" Morris – masterer, mixer

== Charts ==
Chart performance for "Jesus Is Alive!"
Chart (2026)	Peak position
US Hot Christian Songs (Billboard)	17

Chart performance following release of Jesus Is Alive (Vol. 1)
Chart (2026)	Peak position
US Bubbling Under Hot 100 (Billboard)	8
US Digital Song Sales (Billboard)	13
US Hot Christian Songs (Billboard)	1

== Release history ==
Release history and formats for "Jesus Is Alive!"
Region	Date	Format(s)	Label(s)
Various	May 8, 2026	Digital download; streaming	River House Records
Various	May 15, 2026	Digital download; streaming; (with Jesus Is Alive: Vol. 1)	River House Records
Various	December 4, 2026	CD; LP; cassette; digital download; streaming; (with The Jesus Generation)	River House Records
