= Okay! (Forrest Frank song) =

Single by Forrest Frank

from the album The Jesus Generation
- Released: May 3, 2026
- Length: 4:35
- Label: River House Records
- Composer: Forrest Frank
- Lyricists: Axe Williams; D. Mils; Frank; Malachi O'Connor
- Producers: Frank; Williams; Mills; O'Connor; Jordan Podilla; Josh Holiday

Forrest Frank singles chronology
| "Something in the Water" (2026) | "Okay!" (2026) | "Jesus Is Alive!" (2026) |

"Okay!" (Note: Stylized in all caps) is a song by the American Christian musician Forrest Frank. "Okay!" was released on May 3, 2026, through River House Records, to digital download and streaming formats. The song's lyrics were written by Axe Williams, D. Mills, Frank, and Malachi O'Connor, and composed by Frank. Production was handled by Frank and Josh Holiday.

== Development ==
"Okay!" was written while Frank livestreamed on Instagram. Frank recorded and released the song within a week of the livestream. It was written primarily by Frank himself, and features additional lyricist credits from Axe Williams, D. Mils, and Malachi O'Connor. It was produced by Frank alongside Holiday of Elevation Rhythm.

== Style ==
"Okay!"
"Okay!" has been noted for its "jubilant, rose-tinted" optimism.

"Okay!" has often been noted for its optimism. The song implements the use of guitar and drum patterns, in a "jubilant, rose-tinted" manner. It is composed in the key of B♭, with a time signature of 4/4 and a speed of 120 beats per minute. GodTube wrote that "Okay!" "encourages listeners to step back and be grateful for the daily grind of life", while Shore Fire Media wrote that the claims that the "'worries and hurries' are temporary because of God's faithfulness". The lyrics express Frank's belief that, "even though everything feels out-of-place, he can trust that everything will work out for the best". "Okay!" has been considered to be "style-bright, rhythmic, and easy to sing along to" due to the use of "upbeat production" and "deeply personal faith themes".

== Reception ==
"Okay!" received notable success early-on; within the ten days prior to its release, teasers for the song had accumulated 50 million views on social media platforms. Subsequent to release, the song accumulated over a million streams worldwide. Within its first charting week, the song debuted at number 14 on the Billboard Hot Christian Songs chart. In July 2026, the song received support from Christian radio and entered the Christian Airplay chart, where it peaked at number 22. That same month it rose to its peak position of number 5 on the Hot Christian Songs chart. The song also received international success; in Australia it peaked at number 11 on Today's Christian Music's Australian Christian Airplay chart.

== Personnel ==
Credits adapted from Tidal.

- Axe Williams – producer, lyricist, guitar, programmer
- D. Mills – producer, lyricist, bass, programmer
- Forrest Frank – producer, composer, lyricist, programmer, vocals
- Jacob "Biz" Morris – engineer, masterer, mixer
- Jordan Padilla – producer, keyboards, programmer
- Josh Holiday – producer, programmer
- Malachi O'Connor – producer, lyricist, drums, programmer

== Charts ==
Chart performance for "Okay!"
| Chart (2026) | Peak position |
|---|---|
| Australian Christian Airplay (TCM) | 4 |
| US Bubbling Under Hot 100 (Billboard) | 22 |
| US Christian Airplay (Billboard) | 7 |
| US Digital Song Sales (Billboard) | 11 |
| US Hot Christian Songs (Billboard) | 4 |

== Release history ==
Release history and formats for "Okay!"
| Region | Date | Format(s) | Label(s) |
|---|---|---|---|
| Various | May 3, 2026 | Digital download; streaming | River House Records |
| United States | June 29, 2026 | Christian radio | Atlantic Records |
| Various | December 4, 2026 | CD; LP; cassette; digital download; streaming; (with The Jesus Generation) | River House Records |
