= Nate Hochman =

Conservative activist

- Born: 1999 or 2000 (age 26–27)
- Education: Colorado College (BA)
- Political party: Republican

Nate Hochman (born 1999/2000) is an American right-wing political activist and writer. He wrote for the National Review from 2021 to 2023. He currently works as a senior aide at the United States Department of State.

== Early life and education ==
Hochman was raised in a secular Jewish home. He graduated from Colorado College in 2021.

== Career and political controversy ==
Hochman joined the National Review in August 2021. His writing has also appeared in print and online in The American Conservative, City Journal, the Claremont Review of Books, First Things, IM—1776, National Affairs, the New York Post, The Spectator, and other outlets. Hochman's commentary and investigative reporting have led several media outlets to describe him as a prominent intellectual figure in the "New Right". Vox described him as "one of the New Right's young stars", while the New Statesman called him "a key figure of the US intellectual right". He was also featured as one of the main subjects of a short VICE News documentary on young conservatives, which described Hochman as "just 24, but his widespread political writing has made him a kind of influencer for the brainier side of this movement."

Hochman was a 2021 Publius Fellow at the Claremont Institute. In June 2022, he wrote a guest essay for The New York Times, in which he described the modern conservative movement as more secular and centered on class, identity, and culture war issues.

According to a 2022 article published on conservative website The Dispatch, Hochman had debated white nationalist Nick Fuentes in a Twitter Spaces group in 2021. In the debate, he disagreed with Fuentes on a number of topics, while also telling him that "I think Nick is probably a better influence than Ben Shapiro on young men". Hochman was stripped of a political fellowship and disavowed Fuentes later in the same year.

Hochman left the National Review in March 2023 in order to work in Florida governor Ron DeSantis' presidential campaign. During the campaign, Hochman reposted a video from a pro-DeSantis social media account containing a clip in which the Seal of Florida transformed into the Black Sun, a symbol associated with some neo-Nazi groups. Initial reports attributed production of the video to Hochman, which he denied. Semafor subsequently reported that the video had instead emerged from a Signal channel called "War Room Creative Ideas", which was presided over by senior DeSantis campaign staffers. Later reporting from The New York Times reaffirmed that the video had been made “collaboratively” in the DeSantis team's “war room,” with drafts “shared in a large group chat” for edits and input from staff. Nonetheless, Hochman was fired amid a major round of layoffs from the DeSantis campaign in July.

In 2024, Hochman was hired as an advisor to America 2100, a thinktank with ties to then-United States senator Marco Rubio. He was subsequently hired as a policy advisor to United States senator Eric Schmitt in 2025.

In 2026, Hochman joined the U.S. Department of State as a senior aide to Secretary Marco Rubio.
