= World News Network =

News aggregator

- Website type: News Aggregator
- Headquarters: United States
- Owner: World News Inc.
- Employees: 100 (as of June 2011)
- Website: wn.com
- Launched: 1998; 28 years ago

World News (WN) Network (styled WorldNews (WN) Network) is a news aggregator founded in March 1995 and launched online in 1998. In 2003, Search Engine Watch praised the service for its "Special Reports", and called it "an interesting alternative" to other news aggregation services. The company runs other targeted websites as well. It was featured in Forbes's "Best of the Web" in 2000, being commended for its scope, while being criticised for having many links, but "little guidance as to which are good". In 2002, The Guardian's "World news guide" referenced the website. It was featured in Information Today in June 2011.
