= Shore Fire Media =

Publicity and media management firm, based in Brooklyn, New York

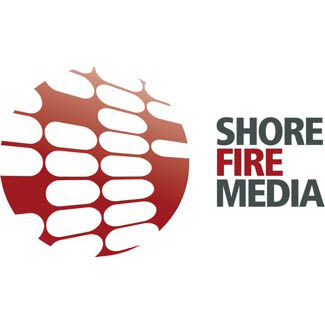
- Industry: Marketing, public relations
- Founded: Brooklyn, New York, US (1990)
- Founder: Marilyn Laverty
- Headquarters: Brooklyn, New York; Nashville, Tennessee; Los Angeles, California, US
- Number of locations: 3
- Website: ShoreFire.com

Shore Fire Media is a public relations firm based in Brooklyn, New York, that specializes in entertainment and popular culture. In 2023, Shore Fire's clients had 43 Grammy nominations.

== History ==
Shore Fire Media was founded in 1990 by Marilyn Laverty in a small office in Brooklyn, New York, with one employee and two desks, and future company co-president Mark Satlof as a consultant.

Laverty previously had worked for 13 years at Columbia Records, rising to become VP of publicity. In 2016, Billboard named Laverty one of the music industry's most powerful female executives in its annual "Women in Music" issue. She has had a long-standing relationship with musician Bruce Springsteen as his publicist.

While the company originally focused on the music industry, it later branched into a wider client base including venues, businesses, websites, books, and non-music events.

In 2013, 2014, 2015, 2018, and 2019, The New York Observer named Shore Fire to its annual PR Power 50 List of the most powerful entertainment and media PR firms. In 2016, The Observer listed Shore Fire as New York City's top arts/culture/media firm, and was recognized again in 2023 for music and entertainment.

In 2013, Shore Fire opened an office in Nashville, Tennessee. In January 2018, Shore Fire opened an office in Los Angeles, California.

In December 2019, the entertainment marketing and content development company Dolphin Entertainment acquired Shore Fire.
