= Connor Price =

Canadian rapper and actor (born 1994)

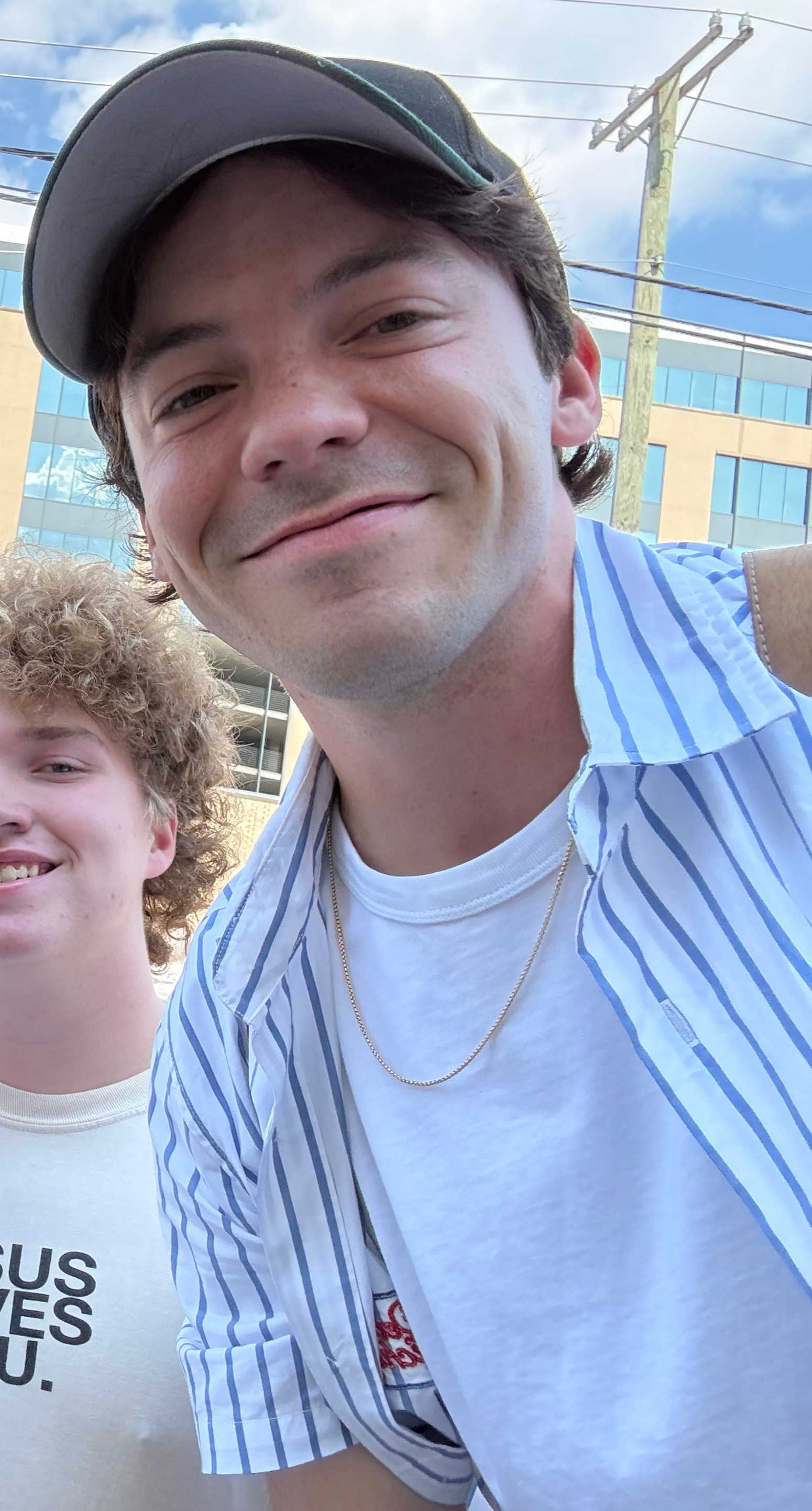
- Price in 2025
- Born: 11 November 1994 (age 32); Markham, Ontario, Canada
- Occupations: Rapper; actor; Internet personality
- Years active: 2000–present (acting); 2017–present (music)
- Spouse: Breanna Price (m. 2016)
- Children: 2
- Musical career
- Genres: Hip-hop; pop rap; boom bap; Christian hip-hop
- Label: 4 of Clubs LLC
- Member of: Paperboys
- Website: connorprice.shop

Connor Price (born 11 November 1994) is a Canadian rapper, actor, and internet personality. He began his career as a child actor and later became a musician. He is best known for his viral "Spin the Globe" series featuring artists from many countries around the world.

== Career ==
=== Acting ===
Price began performing at the age of six. His first notable role was portraying Jay Braddock, in the Academy Award nominated film Cinderella Man. He is best known for playing Kenny, the leader of the Boston vampire clan for two seasons of Syfy's Being Human and the role of Harry James in three seasons of X Company, a World War II spy drama on CBC.

In 2008, at the 29th Young Artist Awards, Price won the Young Artist Award for The Dead Zone. He also won the LAFA February Award for The Riot Act in 2019, which was shared with other actors Lauren Sweetser, Brett Cullen, Micah Hauptman, and Brandon Keener.

In 2024, he made an appearance in the role of a DJ in season 6 of The Rookie on ABC.

=== Music ===
==== Early independent releases and 4 of Clubs (2013–2021) ====
Price first started to make music in the 2013, entering the YouTube Bangaroom Rap Contest with a song titled "Channel Surfing With God", under the stage name Uneyedentified. Out of 100 people, Price won the contest. There was a hiatus before Price began to expand into hip hop and rap music in the late 2010s, releasing his second song "S" on January 4, 2017. This was followed by the EP 4 of Clubs in 2018. The lead single, "Starter Pistol", gained traction after DJ Ricochet played the track on Toronto station FLOW 93.5. Price continued to release singles periodically, including features from Evelyne Brochu, ShaqIsDope, and even having his wife, Breanna Price, on the track "When You're Gone". In 2021, Price collaborated with Idris Elba on the track "Courteney Cox - Extended", with Courteney Cox herself appearing in the music video rapping. According to Elba, Cox "buried" Price on the track. Price kept the momentum in 2021 with the song "'21 Raps" in association with Sportsnet for the Toronto Raptors, along with the TikTok duet originated "Marathon" with 4Korners, who went on to DJ for Price in his first headlining show in December 2023. In this time, Price also collaborated with John Roa, Lex Brachter, Matty Beats, and Chloe Sagum.

==== Trillium, Spin the Globe, and Till Next Time (2022–2023) ====
Price started off 2022 with a multitude of singles, including the first collaborations with his future best friend Nic D, "Nobodies" and "Gasoline", and another collaboration with Chloe Sagum. On a series on his YouTube channel titled Spin The Globe, he would spin a globe and collaborate with an artist from whichever country his finger landed on. This idea came from his wife, Breanna Price, after the first single, "Violet", went unused for the movie Fast X. Connor then asked Zambian artist Killa to feature on the song, creating the Spin the Globe series. The series went viral in 2022, with the help of Price's most streamed song as of June 2026, "Spinnin" with the Dutch artist Bens. After collaborating with artists SIRI, Kazuo, Lucca DL and others, he released the Spin the Globe EP on 27 January 2023. As of April 2025, Spin the Globe had over 480 million streams on Spotify. Price ended off 2022 with his Trillium EP and the single "Buddy" with Hoodie Allen. He started off 2023 by finishing the first Spin the Globe series with "Drop" and "Globe Cypher". Price also released the Till Next Time EP with Nic D, integrating earlier singles such as "Gasoline" with new singles such as "Swordfish" and "It's Going Down". On September 29, Price's remix of the Graham song "HOV" charted at number 48 on Billboard's Hot Dance/Electronic Songs chart, giving Graham his first Billboard chart entry. On October 13, 2023, Price released the track "Ruby" featuring Oliver Cronin, starting the sequel Spin the Globe 2, which was fully released on 23 February 2024, using the same concept. In 2023, his music received over a billion streams across multiple streaming platforms, including over 650 million on Spotify. Price ended off the year by collaborating with Armani White on the track "Million Cash". Other collaborations during the year include Kevin Euerle, Ktlyn, bbno$, and Lucy Ellis, among others.

==== Spin the Globe 2 and Buddy System (2024) ====
Price started off 2024 by finishing off Spin The Globe 2, with collaborations with Harsh Likhari, Yugoszn, and ANAS, as well as bringing back Killa and Bens from season one. He followed up with the single "Up!" in collaboration with Forrest Frank of Surfaces, sparking the later collaboration with Maverick City Music titled "I Need Help". In July 2024, Price teamed with country singer Walker Hayes on the song, "Smoke". He also collaborated with Hoodie Allen for the Buddy System EP, including five tracks such as "Pull Up" and "Crown". He ended the year with a song dedicated to his second child, Molly, in "Molly's Song". Price also released one song with Nic D during 2024, as well as many solo singles. Price's EP "Spin The Globe" and his single with Bens, "Spinnin", were nominated at the 53rd Annual JUNO Awards. Price himself was also nominated for the Breakthrough Artist of the Year award, which he lost to the artist Talk.

==== Iconic, About Time, and Paperboys (2025–present) ====
Price started 2025 by weekly releases of singles, including the "Too Easy" with Nic D and "Happier" with Walker Hayes, before going on tour. Price and Nic D then released another collaborative EP, titled Iconic, including 8 tracks, with new ones such as the remix of Graham's "Diploma" and also the inclusion of the old single "Riptide". Following Iconic, yet another Nic D collaboration titled "Buffalo" was released, along with the single "Big Fish" with Pertinence. On 26 September 2025, Price released his debut album About Time. It has sixteen songs, and features Big Sean, Nic D, Haviah Mighty, K.Keed, Hoodie Allen, and Idris Elba. Following his debut album, while on his European tour, Price made the song, "Still Spinnin", as a sequel to his 2022 hit, "Spinnin". Using a crowd chant Bens started at Price's first show, Graham turned the chant into a beat. Price met up in Amsterdam to record Bens' verse and successfully finished the song before his Amsterdam show, playing it live that night. Price also made a surprise live appearance at the 2025 Holy Smoke! Christian Hip Hop Festival in Nashville, Tennessee.

In 2026, "About Time" received two nominations at the 55th Annual JUNO Awards, with the album being nominated for the "Rap Album/EP of the Year" category, and the song "Mula" with Big Sean being nominated for the "Rap Single of the Year" category. Price lost both. After two months of no music, Price returned with the single "Slide", which hit the Top 10 debut chart on Spotify. Among many other tracks, he also released the song "Scoop", which went viral after him and Nic D created a "ping-pong" vibe around the song, inspired by the movie Marty Supreme. Price also featured on the Hulvey album Could Be Tonight, on the song "Automatic". He also teamed up with singer Shumaq on the track "It's Not Really Funny" after being requested to find an artist with under 5,000 Instagram followers to collaborate with. Price also teamed up with Graham and Nic D for the song "Perfect Timing",along with Token for the track "Bambi". He also released "White Flag" with Zeina as a part of the Boi-1da and Canada Soccer album "What if It All Goes Right?". On June 19, 2026, Price officially launched the Paperboys duo with Nic D, releasing his second album, Paperboys. The album features thirteen songs, including every Connor Price and Nic D single from 2026, along with the new tracks "Talk" and "All About". Paperboys hit number seven on Spotify’s Top Debut Albums USA chart. Price performed at the Milwaukee Summerfest festival while on his Iconic tour with Nic D. Price also voiced the League of Legends character Sett in the Heartsteel track “Live My Life”, along with Anderson .Paak, Baekhyun, and Nic D.

== Filmography ==
=== Film ===
Year	Film	Role	Notes
2002	Sins of the Father	Young Bobby Cherry Jr.	TV movie
2002	Crossed Over	Young Peter Lowry	TV movie
2002	Men with Brooms	Brandon Foley	
2002	A Promise	Stephen	Short film
2002	Fancy Dancing	Michael Pelham	
2003	The Republic of Love	Gary Woloschuck	
2004	Evel Knievel	Younger Kelly Knievel	TV movie
2005	A History of Violence	Kid (Uncredited)	
2005	The Fool	Young Billy	Short film
2005	Cinderella Man	Jay Braddock	
2006	Find	Young Richard	Short film
2007	Good Luck Chuck	Young Charlie Logan	
2007	The Rocket Man	Ben	Short film
2007	The Stone Angel	Young Matt Currie	
2008	Roxy Hunter and the Horrific Halloween	Stefan	TV movie
2009	Back	Michael Miles	TV movie
2009	Ollie & the Baked Halibut	Ollie the Otter	Short film
2009	Booky's Crush	Georgie	TV movie
2010	Almost Kings	Joel	
2010	Summer Camp	Eddy Logan	TV movie
2010	Cancel Christmas	Steve Rojack	
2012	Frenemies	Walker	TV movie
2013	Carrie	Freddy "Beak" Holt	
2014	The Good Witch's Wonder	Jim	TV movie
2018	Honey Bee	Matt	
2018	The Riot Act	August	
2019	Hammer	Jeremy Davis	
2023	Night Shift	Cole	
2026	Madden	Bob Costas	

=== Television ===
Year	Television Series	Role	Episode/Notes
2000	In a Heartbeat	Brandon	"Cinderella Syndrome"
2003	72 Hours: True Crime	Ben Richmond	"Lone Wolf"
2003	Doc	Brendan	"Angels In Waiting"
2003	The Save-Ums!	B.B. Jammies	Unknown Episodes, Voice
2005	Kevin Hill	Bryce	"In This Corner"
2006	Alice, I Think	Mac MacLeod	13 Episodes
2007	Love You to Death	Stuart	"Time Capsule Murder"
2007	The Dead Zone	Johnny "J.J." Bannerman	9 Episodes
2007	The Rick Mercer Report	Boy in 'Canada Savings Bonds'	Season 5, Episode 5
2007	Not This But This	Johnny	Unknown Episodes
2007	Will & Dewitt	Will	
2008	Flashpoint	Noah	Season 5, Episode 10 "A World of Their Own"
2008	The Middleman	Duncan	"The Accidental Occidental Conception"
2008	Bakugan Battle Brawlers	Christopher	3 Episodes (2008)
2009	Guns	Liam Merriweather	Television mini-series (2 Episodes)
2010–2012	R.L. Stine's The Haunting Hour	Brandon	"Really You: Part 1" "Really You: Part 2"
2010–2012	R.L. Stine's The Haunting Hour	Ned	"Most Evil Sorcerer Part 1" "Most Evil Sorcerer Part 2"
2011	Murdoch Mysteries	Ezra Fielding	"Buffalo Shuffle"
2011	Dan for Mayor	Brian McCoogin	"Mayor for a Day"
2011	Haven	Henry Stillman	"Friend or Faux"
2011–2012	What's Up Warthogs!	Teddy Chadwick IV	Series Regular
2012	Alphas	Jason Miller	"Gaslight" (Uncredited) "Gods and Monsters"
2013	Saving Hope	Jake	"Why Waste Time"
2013–2014	Being Human	Kenny Fisher	16 Episodes
2015	Supernatural	Cyrus Styne	"The Prisoner"
2015–2017	X Company	Harry James	22 Episodes
2022	FBI: International	Ethan Castellaw	"The Kill List" "Shouldn't Have Left Her"
2022	Chicago Med	Owen West	"And Now We Come to the End"
2023	CSI: Vegas	Vincent	"Eyeballs"
2024	The Rookie	Be-Bop	"The Hammer"
2024	Tracker	Jasper Trace	"Preternatural"
2026	Grey's Anatomy	Corban Gregory	"(If You Want It) Do It Yourself"

== Discography ==
=== Studio albums ===
List of studio albums
Title	Details
About Time	Released: September 26, 2025; Label: 4 of Clubs LLC; Formats: LP, digital download, streaming
Paperboys (with Nic D)	Released: June 19, 2026; Label: 4 of Clubs LLC; Formats: Digital download, streaming

=== Extended plays ===
List of extended plays
Title	Details
4 of Clubs	Released: August 18, 2018; Label: 4 of Clubs LLC, Amuseio AB; Formats: Digital download, streaming
Trillium	Released: December 9, 2022; Label: 4 of Clubs LLC; Formats: Digital download, streaming
Spin the Globe	Released: January 27, 2023; Label: 4 of Clubs LLC; Formats: Digital download, streaming
Till Next Time (with Nic D)	Released: June 23, 2023; Label: 4 of Clubs LLC; Formats: Digital download, streaming, LP
Spin the Globe 2	Released: February 23, 2024; Label: 4 of Clubs LLC; Formats: Digital download, streaming
Buddy System (with Hoodie Allen)	Released: September 20, 2024; Label: 4 of Clubs LLC, Hoodie Allen LLC; Formats: Digital download, streaming
Iconic (with Nic D)	Released: May 30, 2025; Label: 4 of Clubs LLC, FRDi Entertainment; Formats: Digital download, streaming, LP
100 (with Graham)	Released: September 11, 2026; Label: 4 of Clubs LLC, 100graham sounds; Formats: Digital download, streaming

=== Singles ===
==== As lead artist ====
Title	Year	Peak chart positions		Certifications	Album
Title	Year	NZ Hot	US R&B/HH Digital	Certifications	Album
"When You're Gone" (with Brea Price)	2019	—	—		Non-album singles
"No Visits"	2020	—	—		Non-album singles
"Eastern Ave Night Drive"	2020	—	—		Non-album singles
"Love Language" (with Evelyne Brochu)	2020	—	—		Non-album singles
"You"	2020	—	—		Non-album singles
"The Usual" (with ShaqIsDope)	2020	—	—		Non-album singles
"Midsummer Freestyle"	2020	—	—		Non-album singles
"The Birds"	2020	—	—		Non-album singles
"Happy Alone"	2021	—	—		Non-album singles
"Imposter Syndrome"	2021	—	—		Non-album singles
"Toast"	2021	—	—		Non-album singles
"'21 Raps"	2021	—	—		Non-album singles
"Courteney Cox" (with Idris Elba)	2021	—	—		Non-album singles
"You Said"	2021	—	—		Non-album singles
"Receipts" (with Matty Beats and Lex Bratcher)	2021	—	—		Non-album singles
"Egot"	2021	—	—		Non-album singles
"Talk About Us" (with Chloe Sagum)	2021	—	—		Non-album singles
"Roots"	2021	—	—		Non-album singles
"Marathon" (with 4Korners)	2021	—	—		Non-album singles
"Don't Tell Me" (with John Roa)	2021	—	—		Non-album singles
"Christmas in Vegas"	2021	—	—		Non-album singles
"Happy Face"	2022	—	—		Non-album singles
"City Lights"	2022	—	—		Non-album singles
"Nobodies" (with Nic D)	2022	—	—		Non-album singles
"Smooth"	2022	—	—		Non-album singles
"Splat"	2022	—	—		Non-album singles
"Gasoline" (with Nic D)	2022	—	—		Till Next Time (EP)
"Jude's Song"	2022	—	—		Non-album singles
"Start Again" (with Chloe Sagum)	2022	—	—		Non-album singles
"Easy" (with Nic D)	2022	—	—		Non-album singles
"These Days"	2022	—	—		Non-album singles
"Grateful" (with Callmestevieray)	2022	—	—		Non-album singles
"Aces" (with 4Korners, Akintoye, and Idris)	2022	—	—		Non-album singles
"Straight A's"	2022	—	—		Non-album singles
"Violet" (with Killa)	2022	—	—	MC: Gold	Spin the Globe (EP)
"Selfish" (with Nic D)	2022	—	—		Non-album single
"Spinnin" (with Bens)	2022	23	20	MC: Gold; RIAA: Gold; RMNZ: Gold	Spin the Globe (EP)
"Chuck Taylor" (with Siri)	2022	—	—		Spin the Globe (EP)
"Bankroll" (with Nic D)	2022	—	—		Till Next Time (EP)
"Dip" (with Kazuo)	2022	—	—		Spin the Globe (EP)
"Blue Shell" (with K.Keed)	2022	—	—		Spin the Globe (EP)
"Chatter"	2022	—	—		Non-album single
"False Alarm" (with Lucca DL)	2022	—	—		Spin the Globe
"Buddy" (with Hoodie Allen)	2022	23	—		Non-album singles
"Chirp" (with Hoodie Allen)	2023	—	—		Non-album singles
"Drop" (with Zensery)	2023	—	—		Spin the Globe
"Swing" (with Nic D and 4Korners)	2023	—	—		Non-album singles
"Not a Beanie" (with Bbno$)	2023	—	—		Non-album singles
"Miss You (When You're Gone)" (with Chloe Sagum)	2023	—	—		Non-album singles
"Vroom" (with Hoodie Allen)	2023	—	—		Non-album singles
"I Gave Everything" (with Graham)	2023	—	—		Non-album singles
"It's Going Down" (with Nic D)	2023	—	—		Till Next Time (EP)
"Still Hot" (with Nic D)	2023	—	—		Till Next Time (EP)
"Swordfish" (with Nic D)	2023	—	—		Till Next Time (EP)
"Still Blue" (with Caleb Mitchell)	2023	—	—		Non-album singles
"New Phone" (with Ktlyn)	2023	—	—		Non-album singles
"Hopeless"	2023	—	—		Non-album singles
"All of the Above" (with Kevin Euerie)	2023	—	—		Non-album singles
"Underdog"	2023	—	—		Non-album singles
"Ruby" (with Oliver Cronin)	2023	—	—		Spin the Globe 2 (EP)
"Riptide" (with Nic D)	2023	—	—		Iconic (EP)
"Thrillin" (with Lex Bratcher)	2023	—	—		Non-album single
"Trendsetter" (with Haviah Mighty)	2023	—	—		Spin the Globe 2 (EP)
"No Bad Side" (with Nic D)	2023	—	—		Non-album single
"Can't Give Up" (with Prinz and Graham)	2023	—	—		Spin the Globe 2 (EP)
"Overnight" (with Tommy Royale)	2023	—	—		Spin the Globe 2 (EP)
"East Coast" (with Nic D and Graham)	2023	—	—		Non-album single
"Million Cash" (with Armani White)	2023	23	—		Non-album single
"Tombstone" (with Yugoszn)	2024	—	—		Spin the Globe 2 (EP)
"Amg" (with Killa)	2024	—	—		Spin the Globe 2 (EP)
"John Wick" (with Anas)	2024	—	—		Spin the Globe 2 (EP)
"Customs" (with Harsh Likhari)	2024	—	—		Spin the Globe 2 (EP)
"Too Bad"	2024	—	—		Non-album singles
"Summer Secret"	2024	—	—		Non-album singles
"Golden Goose"	2024	—	—		Non-album singles
"Smoke" (with Walker Hayes)	2024	—	—		Non-album singles
"Benjamin Button" (with Hoodie Allen)	2024	—	—		Buddy System (EP)
"Runaway" (with Hoodie Allen)	2024	—	—		Buddy System (EP)
"Pull Up" (with Hoodie Allen)	2024	—	—		Buddy System (EP)
"Crown" (with Hoodie Allen)	2024	—	—		Buddy System (EP)
"Let Me Cook" (with Nic D)	2024	—	—		Non-album singles
"Gift and a Curse"	2024	—	—		Non-album singles
"Molly's Song"	2024	—	—		Non-album singles
"Back on Tour"	2025	—	—		Non-album singles
"Now What?"	2025	—	—		Non-album singles
"Cubicle"	2025	—	—		Non-album singles
"Too Easy" (with Nic D)	2025	—	—		Iconic (EP)
"Falling Behind"	2025	—	—		Non-album singles
"Happier" (with Walker Hayes)	2025	—	—		Non-album singles
"Caveman" (with Nic D)	2025	—	—		Iconic (EP)
"John Daly" (with Nic D)	2025	—	—		Iconic (EP)
"Big Fish" (with Pertinence)	2025	—	—		Non-album singles
"Buffalo" (with Nic D)	2025	—	—		Non-album singles
"Dialed In"	2025	—	—		About Time
"By My Side"	2025	—	—		About Time
"Still Spinnin" (with Bens)	2025	—	—		Non-album single
"Slide" (with Nic D)	2026	31	—		Paperboys
"Extraordinary"	2026	—	—		Non-album single
"No Middleman" (with Nic D)	2026	—	—		Paperboys
"Top 10"	2026	—	—		Non-album single
"Luv U" (with Nic D)	2026	—	—		Paperboys
"Scoop" (with Nic D)	2026	—	—		Paperboys
"Inside / Outside"	2026	—	—		Non-album single
"Upgrade" (with Nic D)	2026	—	—		Paperboys
"Ride" (with Nic D)	2026	—	—		Paperboys
"It's Not Really Funny" (with Shumaq)	2026	—	—		Non-album single
"Old Ways" (with Nic D)	2026	—	—		Paperboys
"Stuntman" (with Nic D)	2026	—	—		Paperboys
"100 Problems" (with Nic D)	2026	—	—		Paperboys
"Perfect Timing" (with Nic D and Graham)	2026	—	—		Paperboys
"Hop Out" (with Nic D)	2026	—	—		Paperboys
"Another Day In The Sun" (with LaRussell)	2026	—	—		Non-album singles
"Hey Heartbreaker" (with Nic D and Alan Ritchson)	2026	—	—		Non-album singles
"Amnesia" (with Graham)	2026	—	—		100 (EP)
"Ten" (with Graham)	2026	—	—		100 (EP)
"Zero To Hero" (with Graham)	2026	—	—		100 (EP)
"24hrs in Shanghai" (with Kaien Nuen)	2026	—	—		Non-album single
"—" denotes a recording that did not chart or was not released in that territory.

==== As featured artist ====
Title	Year	Peak chart positions				Album
Title	Year	US Rap Digital	US Christ	US Christ Digital	US Christ Stream	Album
"Let Me Down" (with CMTT and Brea Price)	2020	—	—	—	—	Night at the Movies (EP)
"I.D.W.B.F." (with Versvs)	2022	—	—	—	—	The Bridge
"Day Off" (with Iamcreed)	2023	—	—	—	—	Gray
"Sunny" (with Boney M.)	2023	—	—	—	—	Non-album single
"Pink Blue - Remix" (with Tsumyoki)	2023	—	—	—	—	A Message From The Moon (Deluxe)
"Up!" (with Forrest Frank)	2024	3	8	5	5	Child of God
"I Need Help" (with Maverick City Music, Taylor Hill, and Nick Day)	2024	—	14	13	17	Non-album single
"Automatic" (with Hulvey)	2026	—	—	—	—	Could Be Tonight
"Bambi" (with Token)	2026	—	—	—	—	I'm Leaving Soon
"Exquisite Corpse X" (with Watsky, Travis Thompson, Frak, Gifted Gab, Abhi The Nomad, and Chip Fu)	2026	—	—	—	—	Non-album singles
"Don't Rob That Man" (with Xander. and Torey D'Shaun)	2026	—	—	—	—	Non-album singles
"Live My Life" (with Heartsteel, League of Legends, Baekhyun, Anderson .Paak, and Nic D)	2026	—	—	—	—	Non-album singles
"—" denotes a recording that did not chart or was not released in that territory.

=== Promotional singles ===
Title	Year	Album
"Let Go" (with Nic D)	2023	Non-album promotional singles
"Just the Two of Us" (with Lucy Ellis)	2023	Non-album promotional singles
"Push" (with Nic D")	2026	About Time
"Runnin"	2026	About Time
"Despicable"	2026	About Time

== Tours ==
Headlining

- The Price Club Tour (2024)
- The Friends & Family Tour (2025)
- Spin The Globe Tour: Part One (2025)
- Iconic Tour (with Nic D) (2026)

=== Supporting ===
- With or Without You Europe & UK Tour (Hoodie Allen with 4Korners) (2023)

== Awards and nominations ==
Year	Organization	Nominee / work	Category	Result	Ref.
2008	Young Artist Awards	Himself	Young Artist Award	Won	
2024	Juno Awards	Himself	Breakthrough Artist of the Year	Nominated	
2024	Juno Awards	Spin the Globe (EP)	Rap Album/EP of the Year	Nominated	
2024	Juno Awards	"Spinnin'" (with Bens)	Rap Single of the Year	Nominated	
2024	We Love Awards	"Up!" (with Forrest Frank)	Song of the Year	Nominated	
2025	Dove Awards	"Up!" (with Forrest Frank)	Song of the Year	Nominated	
2025	Juno Awards	About Time	Rap Album/EP of the Year	Nominated	
2025	Juno Awards	"Mula" (with Big Sean)	Rap Single of the Year	Nominated	
