= Riot Act (disambiguation) =

The Riot Act was an Act of Parliament passed in Great Britain in 1714.

Riot Act may also refer to:

- "Riot Act" (song), a 1980 song by Elvis Costello and the Attractions
- Riot Act (album), a 2002 album by Pearl Jam
- The Riot Act (film), a 2018 film
- "Riot Act", a song by Skid Row from the 1991 album Slave to the Grind
- "Riot Act", a song by Exodus from the 2007 album The Atrocity Exhibition... Exhibit A
- Crackdown (video game), an Xbox 360 game released as Riot Act in Japan
- RiotACT, a local news website for the Australian Capital Territory, founded in 2000 and rebranded as Region Media in 2025
