= Akintoye (disambiguation) =

Akintoye may refer to:

- Akintoye (rapper)
- Stephen Adebanji Akintoye

== See also ==
- Akitoye
- Ibikunle Akitoye
