= AVU =

AVU may refer to:

- Academy of Fine Arts, Prague (Czech: Akademie výtvarných umění v Praze, acronym AVU)
- Abhi vs the Universe, 2021 hip hop album by Abhi the Nomad
- Alison Van Uytvanck, Belgian tennis player
- Asian Vegetarian Union
- Aceite Vegetal Usado
