= Good Day (Forrest Frank song) =

Single by Forrest Frank

from the album Child of God
- Released: January 19, 2024
- Length: 2:50
- Songwriter: Forrest Frank
- Producers: Forrest Frank; Connor Price

Forrest Frank singles chronology
"Hallelujah" (2024)	"Good Day" (2024)	"UP!" (2024)

Music video
- "Good Day" on YouTube

"Good Day" is a song by American Christian contemporary musician Forrest Frank. The song was released on January 19, 2024, on River House Records. The song reached significant chart positions, most notably No. 2 on the Billboard Hot Christian Songs chart and No. 1 on the Billboard Christian Digital Songs chart, becoming Frank's first No. 1 on his solo career. The song reached No. 2 on the Cross Rhythms UK Top 10. It is included on the album Child of God, as well as the God Is Good and All the Time EPs. On February 9, 2024, four alternate tracks were released.

The song is about a day filled with positivity and gratitude.

== Accolades ==
At the 2024 GMA Dove Awards, "Good Day" won Pop/Contemporary Recorded Song of the Year. "Good Day" was also nominated as Top Christian Song at the Billboard Music Awards that year. At the 2024 We Love Awards, it was nominated for Pop Song of the Year.

In 2024, "Good Day" was nominated at the GMA Dove Awards for Song of the Year.

== Charts ==
=== Weekly charts ===
Weekly chart performance for "Good Day"
Chart (2024)	Peak position
US Bubbling Under Hot 100 (Billboard)	25
US Christian Adult Contemporary (Billboard)	3
US Christian Airplay (Billboard)	3
US Digital Song Sales (Billboard)	8
US Hot Christian Songs (Billboard)	2

Weekly chart performance for "Good Day"
Chart (2025)	Peak position
US Bubbling Under Hot 100 (Billboard)	4

=== Year-end charts ===
Year-end chart performance for "Good Day"
Chart (2024)	Position
UK Cross Rhythms	14
US Christian Adult Contemporary (Billboard)	16
US Christian Airplay (Billboard)	23
US Hot Christian Songs (Billboard)	2
Chart (2025)	Position
US Christian Songs (Billboard)	15

== Certifications ==
Certifications for "Good Day"
Region	Certification	Certified units/sales
New Zealand (RMNZ)	Gold	15,000^{‡}
^{‡} Sales+streaming figures based on certification alone.
