= Hulvey =

American Christian rapper and producer (born 1999)

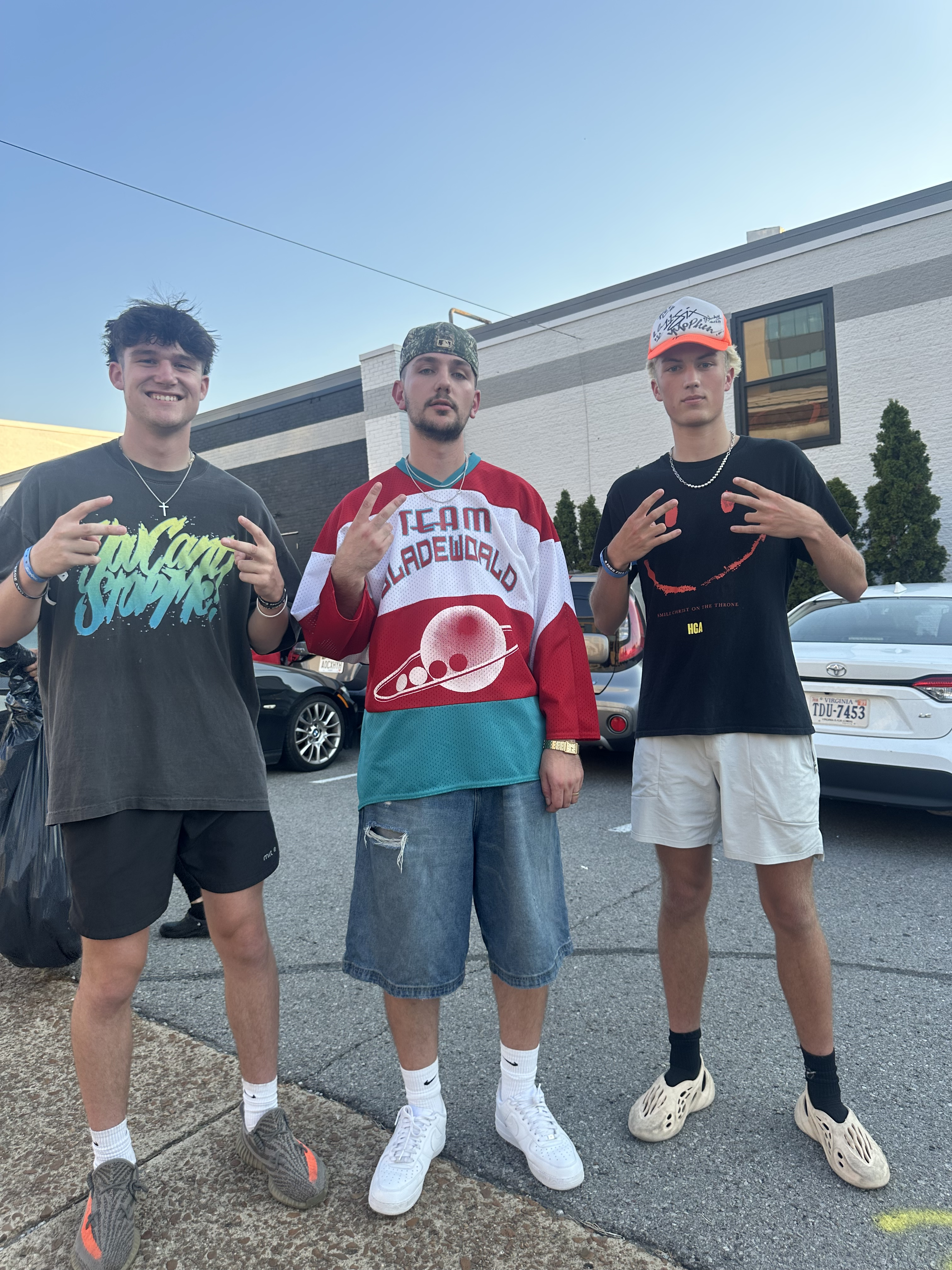
- Hulvey (center) at Holy Smoke! 2025

Background information
- Born: Christopher Michael Hulvey; January 13, 1999 (age 27); Brunswick, Georgia, U.S.
- Genres: Christian hip hop
- Occupations: Rapper; singer; songwriter; record producer
- Years active: 2019–present
- Label: Reach
- Member of: 116
- Website: hulveymusic.com

Christopher Michael Hulvey (born January 13, 1999), known professionally by his surname Hulvey, is an American Christian rapper, singer, songwriter, and record producer.

== Early life and career ==
Hulvey was born and brought up in Brunswick, Georgia. He dropped out of college and moved to Atlanta to pursue a career in music. He supported his music aspirations by working at a local supermarket. Part of his job was "scrubbing toilets [and] cleaning floors." In August 2019, Hulvey signed a contract with Reach Records which was made public in January 2020. His first release with the label was an EP titled Prelude then a month later he followed up with another EP titled BRKNHRT.

Hulvey was featured on "Restored" and "Celebrate More" on Lecrae's album Restoration. Hulvey received writing credits for two additional songs on the album ("Set Me Free" and "Over the Top"). He was also featured on the 116 Clique song "Live Forever" (which recently passed 1 million views on YouTube) and on Jordan Feliz's song "Glorify" alongside his labelmate Lecrae. Hulvey was the opening act during the Social Club Misfits tour in early 2020.

In 2021, his debut album Christopher landed at No. #8 on Billboard Top Christian/Gospel Albums chart, #19 at Rap Albums chart, only one week after its release. In the same year, he released an eight track EP titled COMA. In 2022, he released a standalone single "Beautiful". Also in 2021, Hulvey was featured on a song titled "Higher Power" by Crowder.

In 2023, he was featured in a song with Forrest Frank of Surfaces, called "No Longer Bound". The song reached #2 on the U.S. Viral 50 Chart on Spotify and #19 on the Billboard Hot Christian Songs. In June 2024, Hulvey released a remix of his 2023 song "Altar", featuring Ciara. On September 13, 2024, Hulvey released his second studio album entitled CRY.

On October 24, 2025, Hulvey released his sixth EP He Will Return. On January 6, 2026, he announced his third full-length album Could Be Tonight and that it would be his final work with Reach Records. The album was surprise released on April 8, 2026.

== Tours ==
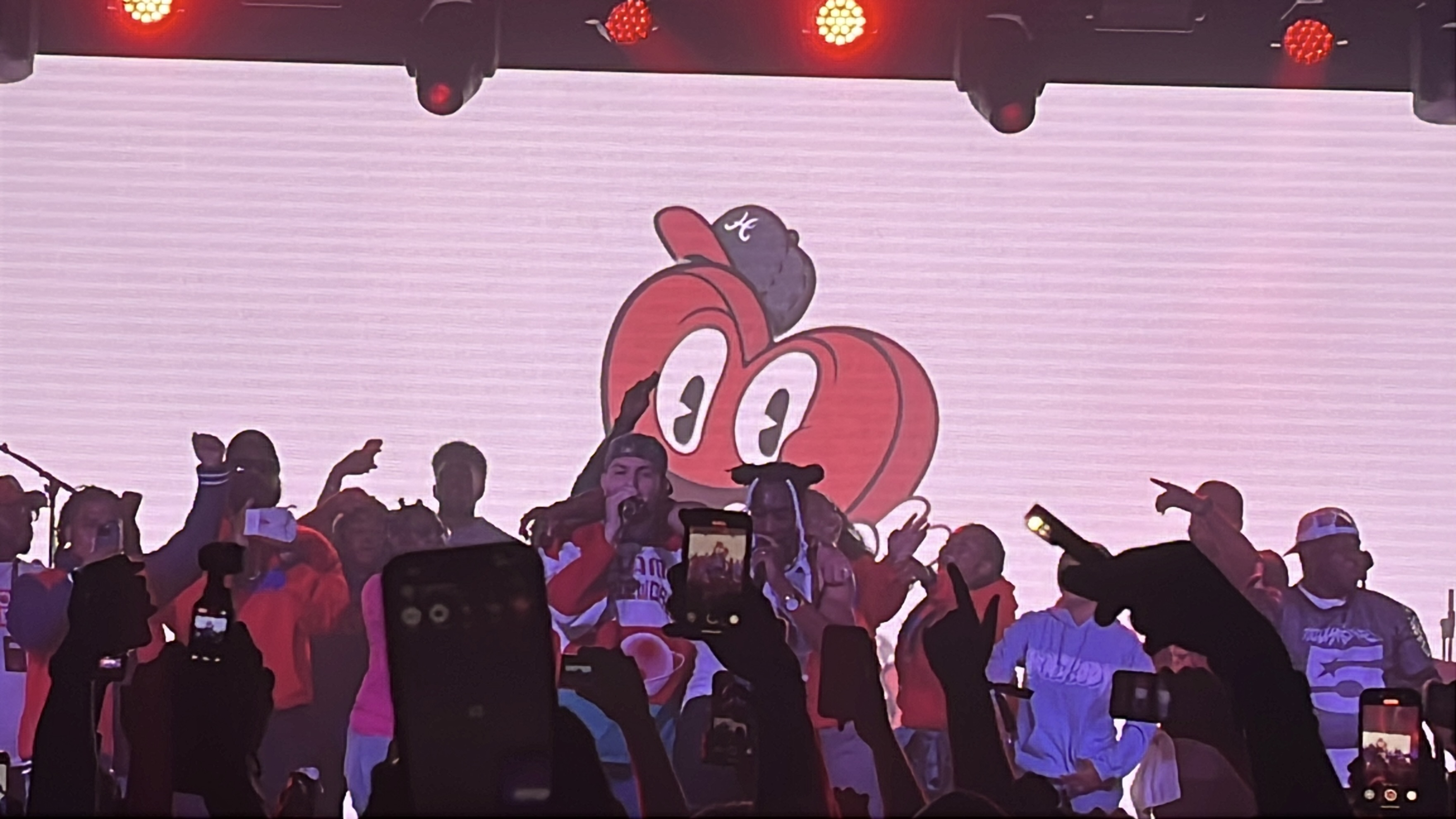
Hulvey performing at Holy Smoke! 2025. Nashville, TN.

In 2023, Hulvey announced his first nationwide tour, The Beautiful Tour, named after his July 2022 single "Beautiful." The Beautiful Tour was a major success, selling out multiple shows in cities across the United States. Hulvey went on the "All For You" Tour in the US in 2024, with nobigdyl. opening for the tour.

== Discography ==
=== Studio albums ===
| Title | Details | Peak chart positions |
| Title | Details | US Christ |
|---|---|---|
| Christopher | Released: April 9, 2021; Label: Reach Records; Format: CD, LP, digital download, streaming | 36 |
| Cry | Released: September 13, 2024; Label: Reach; Format: CD, LP, digital download, streaming | 4 |
| Could Be Tonight | Released: April 8, 2026; Label: Reach; Format: CD, LP, digital download, streaming | 12 |

=== Extended plays ===
| Title | Details |
|---|---|
| Prelude | Released: January 22, 2020; Label: Reach; Format: Digital download, streaming |
| BRKNHRT. | Released: February 21, 2020; Label: Reach; Format: CD, digital download, streaming |
| Coma | Released: November 19, 2021; Label: Reach; Format: digital download, streaming |
| Perry Lane Pack | Released: November 10, 2023; Label: Reach; Format: Digital download, streaming |
| He Will Return | Released: October 14, 2025; Label: Reach; Format: Digital download, streaming |

=== Singles ===
==== As lead artist ====
| Title | Year | Peak chart positions | Certifications | Album |
| Title | Year | US Christ | Certifications | Album |
|---|---|---|---|---|
| "Wasted Times" | 2019 | — | | Non-album single |
| "Motions" | 2019 | — | | BRKNHRT. (EP) |
| "Real Love" | 2019 | — | | Non-album single |
| "Mad Today" | 2019 | — | | Prelude (EP) |
| "In the End" (with Zach Paradis) | 2019 | — | | Non-album singles |
| "Higher" | 2019 | — | | Non-album singles |
| "Different" (with Torey D'Shaun) | 2020 | — | | Non-album singles |
| "Don't Play Cheap" | 2020 | — | | Non-album singles |
| "Otherside" | 2020 | — | | Non-album singles |
| "Heaven Up Above" | 2020 | — | | Non-album singles |
| "Back in the Wick" | 2021 | — | | Christopher |
| "Reasons" (with Lecrae and SVRCINA) | 2021 | — | | Christopher |
| "We Against the World" (with Andy Mineo) | 2021 | — | | Christopher |
| "Beautiful" | 2022 | — | | Non-album single |
| "Have Me" | 2022 | — | | Cry |
| "Closer" (with Torey D'Shaun) | 2022 | — | | Non-album singles |
| "Walk" (with Lecrae) | 2023 | 31 | | Non-album singles |
| "Altar" (with Forrest Frank) | 2023 | 27 | RIAA: Gold | Cry |
| "Used By You" | 2023 | — | | Non-album single |
| "Love Like That" (with Torey D'Shaun and Alex Jean) | 2023 | — | | Cry |
| "All For You" | 2024 | — | | Cry |
| "True" | 2024 | — | | Cry |
| "Rolling Loud Freestyle" (with Caleb Gordon) | 2025 | — | | Non-album singles |
| "Bring Heaven Down" | 2025 | 30 | | Non-album singles |
| "Rain on Me" (with Jean) | 2025 | — | | Non-album singles |
| "Jesus Is Lord" | 2025 | — | | Non-album singles |
| "Rooftop" (with Nobigdyl.) | 2026 | — | | Could Be Tonight |
| "Automatic" (with Connor Price) | 2026 | — | | Could Be Tonight |
| "Dave" | 2026 | 32 | | Could Be Tonight |
"—" denotes a recording that did not chart or was not released in that territory.

==== As featured artist ====
| Title | Year | Peak chart positions | | | Album |
| Title | Year | US Christ | US Christ Air | US Christ AC | Album |
|---|---|---|---|---|---|
| "Nothin But You" (with Andy Mineo, Montell Fish, and Becca VanDerbeck) | 2019 | — | — | — | The Gift: A Christmas Compilation |
| "Celebrate More" (with 116, Mineo, and Lecrae) | 2020 | — | — | — | Non-album single |
| "Glorify" (with Jordan Feliz and Lecrae) | 2020 | 22 | 18 | 16 | Say It |
| "Still 40 Deep" (with 116 and Anike) | 2021 | — | — | — | Non-album singles |
| "Teslar" (with BigBreeze) | 2021 | — | — | — | Non-album singles |
| "No Longer Bound" (with Forrest Frank) | 2023 | 19 | — | — | Child of God |
| "Fly Away" (with Forrest Frank) | 2023 | 43 | — | — | New Hymns |
| "Bounce Back" (with Kijan Boone) | 2025 | — | — | — | Non-album single |
"—" denotes a recording that did not chart or was not released in that territory.

=== Promotional singles ===
| Title | Year | Certifications | Album |
|---|---|---|---|
| "Anchor" (instrumental) | 2020 | | Non-album promotional single |
| "Can't Tell It All" (with KB and Lecrae) | 2021 | RIAA: Gold | Coma (EP) |
| "Altar" (wih Ciara) | 2024 | | Non-album promotional single |
| "American Idolz" (with DC3) | 2025 | | He Will Return (EP) |

=== Other charted songs ===
| Title | Year | Peak chart positions | Album |
| Title | Year | US Christ | Album |
|---|---|---|---|
| "How Great" (Tauren Wells featuring Phil Wickham and Hulvey) | 2026 | 31 | Breathe on It |

== Awards and nominations ==
| Year | Nominee / work | Organizion | Category | Result | Ref. |
|---|---|---|---|---|---|
| 2025 | Cry | GMA Dove Awards | Rap/Hip-Hop Album of the Year | Won | |
| 2026 | "Dave" | GMA Dove Awards | Rap/Hip Hop Recorded Song of the Year | Pending | |
| 2026 | Could Be Tonight | GMA Dove Awards | Rap/Hip Hop Album of the Year | Pending | |
