= Charlie Curtis-Beard =

American rapper and TikToker

- Born: May 29, 1997 (age 29); Lincoln, Nebraska
- Origin: Los Angeles, California
- Genre: Hip hop
- Occupations: Rapper, influencer
- Years active: 2014–present
- Label: UnderCurrent
- Website: charliecurtisbeard.com

TikTok information
- Page: Charlie Curtis-Beard
- Followers: 1.7M
- Last updated: 2023-08-15

Charlie Curtis-Beard (born May 29, 1997) is an American rapper, singer, and social media personality. He joined TikTok in March 2020 and became popular on the platform, reaching 1.7 million followers as of April 2023. As a rapper, he has released three EPs and four studio albums, receiving praise from the Chicago Reader and Ones to Watch, and has opened for Ella Mai, Abhi the Nomad, and Stacey Ryan.

== Early life ==
Originally from Lincoln, Nebraska, Curtis-Beard grew up attending church, where his mother played the organ and his father the drums in the church's worship band. Discouraged by his parents from listening to secular music, he was instead exposed to gospel artists, which would influence the sound and message of his music. He wrote "horrible cheesy songs" from a young age, but only began seriously pursuing music and production in high school. According to Curtis-Beard, he had a high school Vine account on which he had around 60,000 followers. As a senior, he competed in the Nebraska iteration of the Louder Than a Bomb youth poetry slam, where he won the "Spirit of the Slam" award.

After high school, Curtis-Beard moved to Chicago to attend Columbia College Chicago, where he studied jazz piano and graduated in 2019. While at Columbia, he won first place at Columbia's Biggest Mouth competition, held at Metro Chicago, and was awarded a slot opening for Ella Mai at the Manifest urban arts festival.

== Career ==
Prior to his social media career, Curtis-Beard had released two EPs, A.D.D.P. (2014) and Doneish (2017), and three studio albums, Childish (2016), Existentialism on Lake Shore Drive (2017), and 22 in Eden (2019). Childish, released in May 2016, was included on the Chicago Reader's "The best overlooked Chicago hip-hop of 2016" list, where writer Leor Galil wrote that the album "feels like part of the tapestry of Chicago hip-hop" and praised the album's "youthful euphoria and strong soul influence". A year later, Doneish was included on Bandcamp Daily's May 2017 "Best New Soul" list. A third EP, Rain in Pasadena, was released in December 2020 and received praise from Ones to Watch, who called it "concise, relaxing, easygoing, and a showcase of Curtis-Beard's strong lyricism".

Curtis-Beard moved to Los Angeles shortly before the COVID-19 pandemic, hoping to make connections in the music industry. When the pandemic disrupted those plans, he joined TikTok, posting his first video in March 2020 and reaching 350,000 followers by the end of the year. He found success with music- and hip hop-themed content, including rap and dance challenges, adding original verses to Super Mario soundtracks and popular TikTok sounds, rapping in asymmetrical time signatures, and promoting his music. He also became known for collaborating with other TikTok musicians. One of his videos, a 2021 duet of vocal group Earcandy performing the 1950s doo wop song "Lollipop" received over 2.5 million views and was ultimately recorded and released as a formal single. He had 1.7 million followers on the platform as of April 2023.

In April 2022, Curtis-Beard collaborated with R&B singer and former Columbia roommate Grace Kinter on the single "Chamomile Honey"; the two had previous collaborated on "Saturday Cartoons" from Curtis-Beard's Childish album. "Chamomile Honey" was subsequently featured on Vocalo's April 2022 "In Rotation" playlist.

Curtis-Beard's fourth album, Polaroids of Venice, was released in August 2022. In October, he was announced as one of 11 social media creators, including Francesca Fiorentini, who had signed development deals with Universal Studio Group to create original series, as part of the company's Creator Accelerator initiative. In November, he performed alongside Abhi the Nomad at the Somerville Theatre's Crystal Ballroom; he had previously appeared on Abhi's 2021 album Abhi vs the Universe. That same month, he collaborated with rapper Tobi Lou and finance personality Money Coach Vince on the song "Money on Me", as part of Ally Financial and Anomaly's "Ally Lyrically" TikTok promotional campaign.

In early 2023, Curtis-Beard and Sophia James opened for Stacey Ryan on several dates of her residency at The Sun Rose in Los Angeles. In April, he and DJ trio Cheat Codes opened for Flo Rida at the Tufts University Spring Fling music festival. He also announced plans for a new EP later in the year.

In 2024, Curtis-Beard released the album Love in LA and began releasing music as part of the duo "a few new friends" alongside collaborator Ramya Pothuri. In May 2025, Curtis-Beard's project from the Creator Accelerator Program, the TV series The Warehouse Phase was announced as debuting on Peacock on May 19th 2025. Curtis-Beard also confirmed the release of Chi From The Chi, a soundtrack album to accompany the series.

== Artistry ==
Curtis-Beard is known for blending hip hop with elements of soul, pop, and R&B with playful, self-effacing lyrics centered on positivity, self-acceptance, and growing into adulthood. His debut album Childish and the EP DONEish were both noted for their strong soul influence, with the latter having echoes of Kanye West, Slick Rick, and Odd Future's work with Frank Ocean. His second album, Existentialism on Lake Shore Drive, loosely themed around a series of fictional voicemail messages from friends, saw him expand his style into new genres, such as the electronic hip house track "Can't See Clear" which the Chicago Reader compared to Vic Mensa’s "Down on My Luck". His 2020 EP Rain in Pasadena included "Move Forward Together", a pop rap song with funk elements, and "Sunlight, Quiet, Flowers", a synthesizer-driven ballad.

In reference to his musical style, Curtis-Beard has said, "I like to say I speak for the weirdos." Growing up, he listened to gospel artists like J. Moss, Fred Hammond, and Mary Mary and older R&B/soul artists like The Winans and Bryan McKnight. By college he had discovered hip hop through Chance the Rapper, Vic Mensa, Kyle, and Kanye West, and has since cited Alina Baraz, The Internet, Kaytranada, Lucky Daye, Nao, Anderson .Paak, and Saba as influences. His songs are primarily produced first with lyrics added afterward.

On TikTok, Curtis-Beard's persona has been described as "relatable and sweet, like the boy-next-door", while Insider describes his musical videos as "delightful and full of slick wordplay and pop culture callbacks". He is recognized for his signature catchphrase "Oh my" and for challenging masculine social norms by wearing nail polish, a practice referenced in his single "Nails Mint Green".

== Discography ==
=== Studio albums ===
- Childish (2016)
- Existentialism on Lake Shore Drive (2017)
- 22 in Eden (2019)
- Polaroids of Venice (2022)
- Love in LA (2024)

=== EPs ===
- A.D.D.P. (2014)
- Doneish (2017)
- Rain in Pasadena (2020)

=== Singles ===
Year	Title	Album
2015	"Saturday Cartoons" (featuring Grace Kinter)	Childish
2017	"Charlie Isaiah" (featuring Isis Serrano, Jason Saldana & Brian Danzy)	Non-album single
2017	"Kauai"	Existentialism on Lake Shore Drive
2018	"Out My Mind" (featuring Noel)	22 in Eden
2018	"Open Your Eyes"	22 in Eden
2018	"Coasting" (featuring Noel)	Non-album single
2019	"Nobody Likes Me"	22 in Eden
2020	"Hold Tight"	Non-album single
2020	"Greener" (featuring PattyBoomba)	Rain in Pasadena
2021	"Pretty and Pretty" (featuring Zachary Bynum)	Non-album single
2021	"Anime & Chardonnay" (featuring Akintoye)	Polaroids of Venice
2021	"I Like Myself Sometimes" (ft. Ariza)	Non-album singles
2021	"Lollipop" (ft. EARCANDY)	Non-album singles
2022	"Nails Mint Green"	Polaroids of Venice
2022	"All My Friends Are Getting Married" (featuring Skylar Capri)	Polaroids of Venice
2022	"Good girls Bad Girls"	Non-album single
2022	"Something in the Water" (featuring Nina Ann Nelson)	Polaroids of Venice
2023	"more than amigos" (featuring Ebony Loren)	Non-album singles
2023	"Do it For Our Love"	Non-album singles
2023	"BUNS" (featuring Naethan Apollo & Carter Ace)	Non-album singles
2023	"Violet" (featuring Victor Franco)	Non-album singles
2023	"How U Feel" (featuring Stacey Ryan)	Non-album single
2023	"Unlovable Loverboy"	Love in LA
2024	"Disney Princess"	Love in LA
2024	"Pain!!!"	Love in LA
2024	"Dishes & Laundry" (featuring Victor Franco)	Love in LA
2024	"Fine Fine Line" (featuring ego n friends) (as part of a few new friends)	Non-album singles
2024	"BIG GIRL!" (with Gameboy Jones)	Non-album singles
2024	"feel like gold" (as part of a few new friends)	Non-album singles
2024	"something about you" (as part of a few new friends)	Non-album singles
2025	"I want it like that"	Non-album singles
2025	"brown skin glow"	Non-album singles
2025	"Cool With It" (with Gameboy Jones)	Non-album singles
2025	"Poolside & OJ" (feat. Abhi The Nomad)	Non-album singles
2025	"Teddy Bear" (feat. Jackson Lundy)	Non-album singles

=== Music videos ===
Year	Title	Director
2015	"Saturday Cartoons"	Benjamin Curtis-Beard
2016	"Charlie Isaiah"	Reed C. Carson
2017	"Kauai"	Reed C. Carson
2018	"Weird Kids"	Charlie Curtis-Beard
2020	"Hold Tight"	Darren Bui
2023	"BUNS"	Reed Carson
