= Abhi the Nomad =

Indian rapper and singer (born 1993)

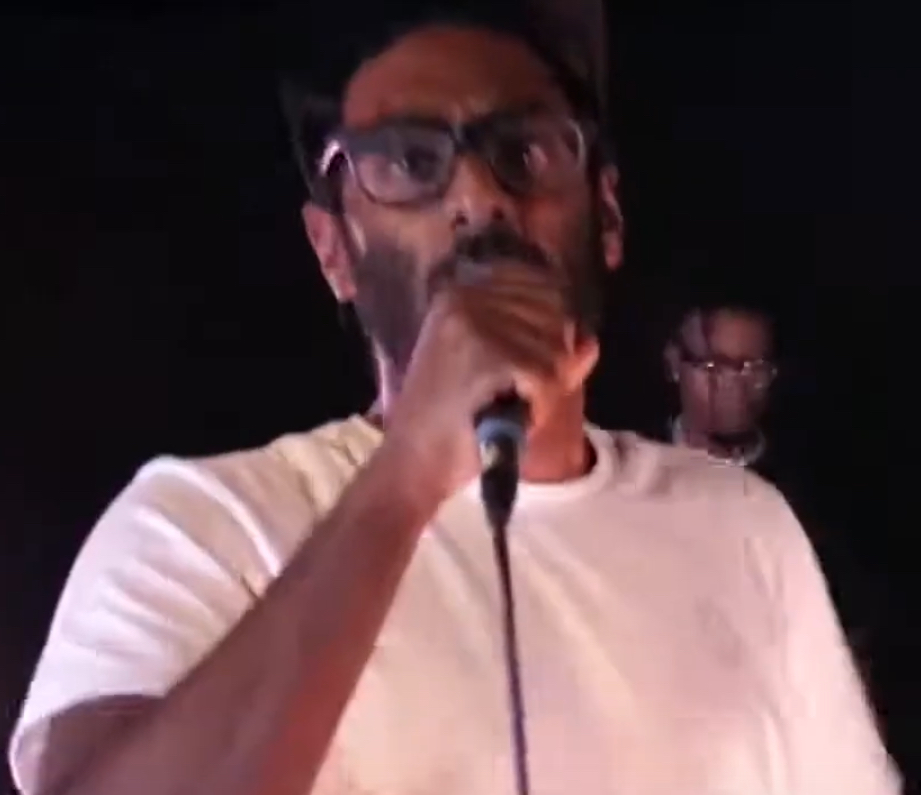
- Vaidehi in 2019

Background information
- Born: Abhi Sridharan Vaidehi; 14 April 1993 (age 33); Madras, India
- Genres: Alternative hip hop; conscious hip hop; pop rap; pop
- Occupations: Rapper; singer; songwriter
- Years active: 2014–2025
- Labels: UnderCurrent; Riptide Music; DeepMatter; Tommy Boy; OK-Tho
- Website: www.abhithenomad.com

Abhi Sridharan Vaidehi (born April 14, 1993), better known by his stage name Abhi the Nomad, is an Indian rapper, singer, songwriter, and producer associated with alternative hip hop music. As of 2023, Vaidehi has released five full-length albums, Marbled, Modern Trash, Abhi vs the Universe, its sequel Abhi vs the Universe II, and Destroyer, as well as six extended plays.

== Early life ==
Vaidehi was born in Madras, India to a diplomat father who was frequently forced to travel. In addition to India, Sridharan Vaidehi has resided in China, Hong Kong, France, the Fiji Islands and the United States. The events of Vaidehi's childhood heavily influenced his stage name, "Nomad", meaning a person without a fixed habitat.

Some of Vaidehi's earliest musical influences included Blink-182 and Linkin Park. He later found himself fascinated with the music of Chicago rapper Kanye West, whom he has described as his gateway into hip-hop music. Of his introduction to the genre, Sridharan Vaidehi stated "Ye got me into hip-hop, and Jay kept me coming back."

== Career ==
Vaidehi has released five full-length albums as well as five extended plays (excluding acoustic versions of his albums). Of all of the songs in his expansive discography, more than half are collaborations. Some of his most frequent collaborators are Khary, Harrison Sands, Sherm, and Foster Cazz.

=== 2018–2019: Marbled and Modern Trash ===
On 9 February 2018, Vaidehi released his first studio album, Marbled, under Tommy Boy Records. It included the song "Sex n Drugs", which went on to become his most popular song.

On 4 October 2019, Vaidehi released his second studio album, Modern Trash, as a call to action for the environment. It was supported by the singles "House of Clocks" and "Me No Evil". A Modern Trash LP, which included one exclusive bonus track, was sold for a limited time.

=== 2020–2023: Abhi vs the Universe and subsequent sequel ===
In 2020, Vaidehi signed to UnderCurrent Entertainment.

In 2020, Vaidehi released a rap EP, Abhi Vs Kato, in collaboration with music producer Kato on the Track.

On 12 September 2021, Vaidehi released his third studio album, Abhi vs the Universe. A limited-time cassette tape of the album was produced in a small quantity and sold on Vaidehi's Bandcamp page. In December 2021, nearly three months after the release of Abhi vs the Universe, a deluxe edition of the album was released on all platforms.

On 3 August 2022, Abhi the Nomad announced a twenty-stop tour entitled Abhi the Nomad: Universe Tour. The tour ran for just over two months from 18 September 2022, to 20 November 2022, and saw support from singer-songwriter and TikTok influencer Charlie Curtis-Beard.

On 6 January 2023, Vaidehi announced on Twitter and his Discord server that a second EP with Kato on the Track, Abhi vs Kato II: Gold Standard, (which would serve as a sequel to 2020's Abhi vs Kato) was in progress. The project's first single, entitled "Gordon Ramsay", was released on 27 January. The album's tracklist was released on 22 February, and the EP was released on 24 February.

On 3 April 2023, Vaidehi announced his fourth studio album, Abhi vs the Universe II: Heart of the Galaxy, with a short teaser released to his YouTube channel. The album serves as a sequel to his third album, Abhi vs the Universe, and was released on 25 August 2023.

On 18 August 2023, an early release edition of Abhi vs the Universe II was put up for sale. It contained an early access digital edition of the album, a signed CD, a short film, and access to an exclusive livestream for fans. The album is supported by three singles, "Casanova", "Star Death", and "Top Ramen".

=== 2024–present: Universe Goods Co. and Destroyer ===
In 2024, Abhi the Nomad launched an independent label called Universe Goods Co., and subsequently formed a pop rap group called Ice Cream Social with his frequent collaborators, including singer Harrison Sands and producer Shane Doe. Their debut single "Hola" was released in January. Vaidehi also signed rapper Cooley Cal to the label.

He released his fifth and final album Destroyer on June 27, featuring the singles "Backrooms", "London Fog", "Nepo”, and "Do Not Destroy". This was following an announcement that he would retire from music after the album cycle.

== Personal life ==
As of October 2019, Abhi the Nomad resides in Austin, Texas.

Of his heritage, he stated in an interview with the Chicago Sun-Times "I'm not really complaining — being Indian's actually almost an advantage... but it'd be cool if a lot of Indians were prominent in hip-hop. They're not, and I don't know why." Sridharan Vaidehi speaks French, Tamil and English.

Vaidehi supported Bernie Sanders in the 2020 Democratic Party presidential primaries.

== Discography ==
=== Studio albums ===
Album	Album details
Marbled	Released: 9 February 2018; Label: Tommy Boy Records; Formats: Digital download, streaming, CD
Modern Trash	Released: 4 October 2019; Label: DeepMatter; Formats: Digital download, streaming, vinyl
Abhi vs the Universe	Released: 12 September 2021; Label: UnderCurrent; Formats: Digital download, streaming, vinyl, cassette
Abhi vs the Universe II	Released: 25 August 2023; Label: UnderCurrent; Formats: Digital download, streaming, vinyl, CD
Destroyer	Released: 27 June 2025; Label: UnderCurrent; Formats: Digital download, streaming, vinyl, CD

=== Extended plays ===
Album	Album details
Beginning	Released: 22 December 2014; Label: Self-released; Formats: Digital download, streaming
Where Are My Friends	Released: 14 October 2015; Label: OK-Tho Records; Formats: Digital download, streaming
Catharsis	Released: 21 October 2016; Label: Self-released; Formats: Digital download, streaming
Abhi Vs Kato (with Kato)	Released: 4 November 2020; Label: UnderCurrent; Formats: Digital download, streaming
Abhi Vs Kato II: Gold Standard (with Kato)	Released: 24 February 2023; Label: UnderCurrent; Formats: Digital download, streaming
Icarus (with Khary)	Released: 23 August 2024; Label: Universe Goods Co. / Kousteau; Formats: Digital download, streaming

=== Mixtapes ===
Album	Album details
Cat Food: The Mixtape	Released: 20 November 2023; Formats: Digital download
