= Brett Cullen =

American actor (born 1956)

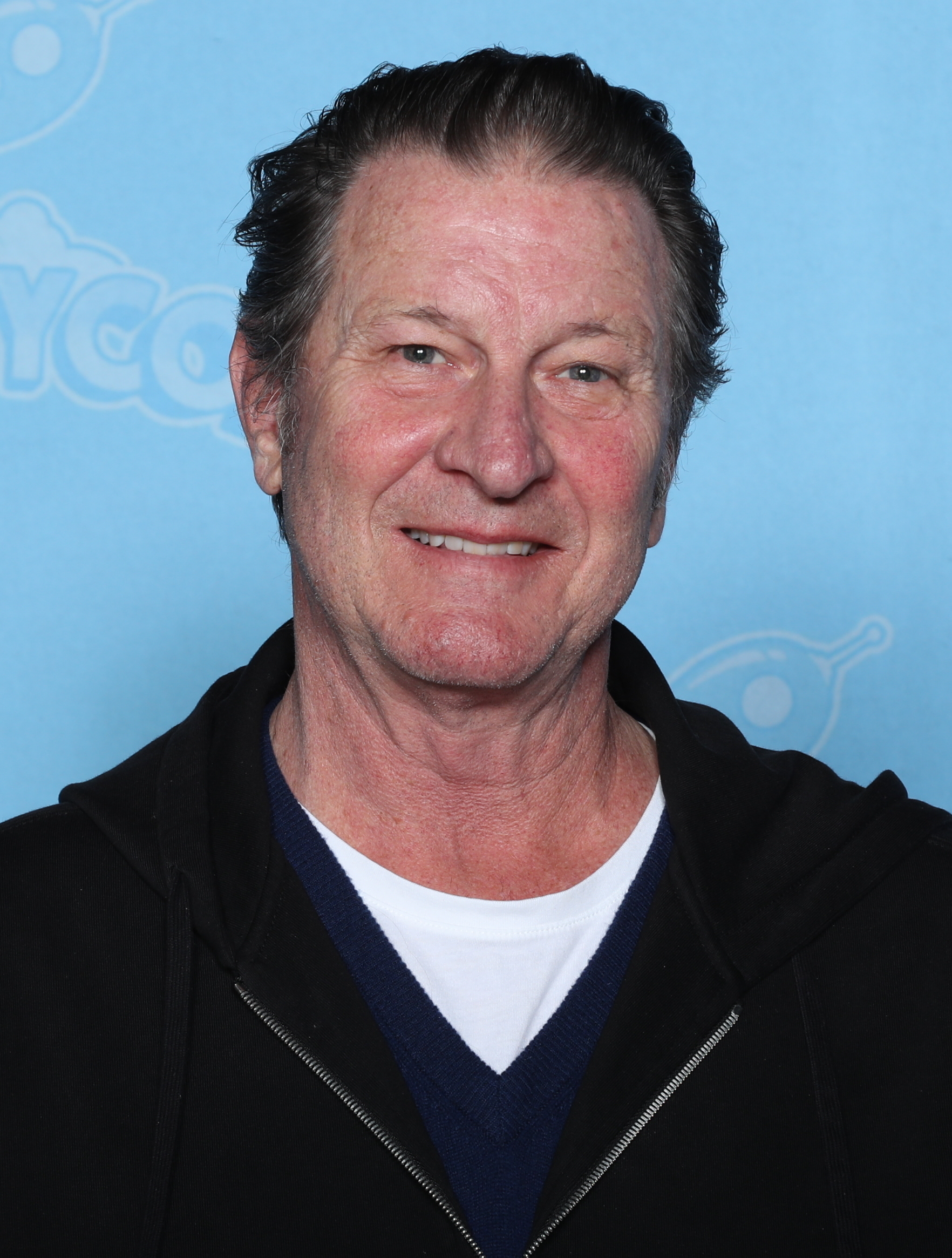
- Cullen in 2020
- Born: Peter Brett Cullen; August 26, 1956 (age 70); Houston, Texas, U.S.
- Education: University of Houston
- Occupation: Actor
- Years active: 1979–present
- Spouse: Michele Little (m. 1988)
- Children: 1
- Website: brettcullen.com

Peter Brett Cullen (born August 26, 1956) is an American actor. He is best known for his roles as Dan Fixx in Falcon Crest (1986–1988), Sam Cain in The Young Riders (1989–1990), Governor Ray Sullivan in The West Wing (2005–2006), Goodwin Stanhope in Lost (2005–2008), Mark Keeler in Make It or Break It (2009–2012), Nathan Ingram in Person of Interest, and Michael Stappord in Devious Maids (2013–2015).

== Early life ==
Cullen was born August 26, 1956, in Houston, Texas, the son of Catherine and Lucien Hugh Cullen, an oil industry executive and part of one of the most famous and wealthiest oil families in the oil-rich history of Texas. He graduated from Madison High School in Houston in 1974, subsequently attending the University of Houston from which he graduated in 1979. His alma mater awarded him a Distinguished Alumni Award in April 2012.

Cullen has given credit to his University of Houston theater professor, Cecil Pickett, who also mentored such Houston-born actors as Dennis Quaid, Randy Quaid, and Brent Spiner. Cullen and Dennis Quaid's friendship dates back to the 1970s; it is Cullen who introduced Quaid to his former wife, Kimberly Buffington, at a dinner in Austin, Texas.

== Career ==
Cullen played Dan Fixx in the 1980s CBS drama Falcon Crest for two seasons (1986–88) and Sam Cain in the ABC western series The Young Riders for one season (1989–90). In 1980, he appeared as the second Gideon Chisholm in the last nine episodes of the CBS western miniseries The Chisholms. In the four earlier episodes, the Gideon Chisholm role was played by Brian Kerwin. Cullen was the lead actor as Ned Logan in the short-lived Legacy, which lasted for just one season (1998–99). On the series The West Wing Cullen played Ray Sullivan, a fictional former U.S. attorney, state attorney general, and governor of West Virginia and the Republican nominee for vice president.

His guest appearances on TV include: The Incredible Hulk, Tales from the Crypt, M*A*S*H, V, Matlock, Star Trek: Deep Space Nine, Ally McBeal, Walker, Texas Ranger, Once and Again, Without a Trace, Cold Case, The Mountain, Monk, CSI: Miami, NCIS, Desperate Housewives, Pepper Dennis, Criminal Minds, Lost, Ghost Whisperer, Private Practice, Ugly Betty, and Friday Night Lights. In 2009, he had a recurring role in the ABC Family television series Make It or Break It.

He played one of the CAPCOMs in Apollo 13 and real-life astronaut David Scott in the HBO miniseries From the Earth to the Moon.

=== Later work ===
In 1994, Cullen played a small role in Kevin Costner's Wyatt Earp. Subsequent film roles included Jamie Johnson in Something to Talk About, aspiring composer/hired escort Bryan in The Hired Heart 1997, the spoiled quarterback Eddie Martel in The Replacements (2000), Charlie Martin in the TV film version of On Golden Pond, Nancy's father Carson Drew in the TV film Nancy Drew, and Barton Blaze (father of Johnny Blaze / Ghost Rider) in the 2007 film Ghost Rider.

In 2011, he played stepfather to Selena Gomez's character in the romantic comedy Monte Carlo, and in 2012, appeared as a congressman in the Batman film The Dark Knight Rises. He also played Tom Eckert, father of protagonists Jed and Matt, in the remake of Red Dawn (a role played in the original 1984 film by Harry Dean Stanton).

Cullen has found steady work in numerous television roles for many years. In addition to guest-starring roles in dozens of series, in 1983 he played Bob Cleary in the miniseries The Thorn Birds. In 1997, he was cast as Adam in a three-episode story arc on Suddenly Susan called "Love and Divorce American Style". The following year, he played love interest Luke Barton in the short-lived series The Simple Life opposite Judith Light. Later in 1998, the UPN television network gave him the starring role of family patriarch Ned Logan in the post-Civil War drama Legacy, which lasted 18 episodes before cancellation.

After 2000, he played small recurring roles in ABC's Once and Again, the low-rated series The Mountain, and as a detective in two episodes of Desperate Housewives. Cullen was awarded a meatier part on The West Wing in 2005–06, when he played West Virginia governor and vice presidential candidate Ray Sullivan. Later in 2006, he played a recurring role on Pepper Dennis, which was cancelled after its first season as well. He played a short-lived love interest of Vanessa Williams' Wilhelmina Slater on Ugly Betty in early 2007, and followed that up with a story arc as dad Walt Riggins on Friday Night Lights. Cullen had recurring roles in the series Lost, Damages, and The Gates between 2007 and 2010.

From 2011 to 2016, Cullen played the flashback character Nathan Ingram on the hit series Person of Interest. He also plays Mark Keeler, father of Olympic gymnast hopefuls Payson and Becca Keeler, on the ABC Family series Make It or Break It.

On February 8, 2011, Cullen was named the official spokesman for Houston Works which helps Houston residents with job training and placement, scholarships, consulting, technical initiatives focusing on science, technology, engineering and mathematics and summer job programs along with Youth Summits.

In 2013, Cullen was cast in the television series Devious Maids, and in 2014 Cullen had recurring roles on the television series Revenge, Criminal Minds, and Under the Dome. He also starred in the film The Last Rescue.

In 2019, Cullen played Thomas Wayne in the film Joker.

== Filmography ==
=== Film ===
Year	Title	Role	Notes
1986	Stewardess School	Philo Henderson	
1991	By the Sword	Danny Gallagher	
1991	Where Sleeping Dogs Lie	John Whitney	
1992	Leaving Normal	Kurt	
1993	Prehysteria!	Frank Taylor	
1994	Wyatt Earp	Saddle Tramp	
1995	Apollo 13	CAPCOM 1	
1995	Something to Talk About	Jamie Johnson	
1997	The Killing Jar	Michael Sanford	
1997	Levitation	James	
2000	The Replacements	Eddie Martel	
2003	National Security	Heston	
2003	Learning Curves	Brad Sr.	
2006	Gridiron Gang	Frank Torrance	
2007	Ghost Rider	Barton Blaze	
2007	The Life Before Her Eyes	Paul McFee	
2008	Brothel	Avery	
2008	The Burning Plain	Robert	
2009	Killing Dinner	Michael Dinner	
2009	Reunion	Jake	
2010	Crooked Lane	Ben	
2010	The Runaways	Don Currie	
2011	Puncture	Nathaniel Price	
2011	Monte Carlo	Robert Kelly	
2011	Beneath the Darkness	Sergeant Phil Nickerson	
2012	The Dark Knight Rises	Congressman Byron Gilley	
2012	Living in the Age of Surveillance	Nathan Ingram	Short film; related to Person of Interest
2012	Red Dawn	Sergeant Tom Eckert	
2012	The Guilt Trip	Ben Graw	
2013	42	Clay Hopper	
2015	The Last Rescue	Captain Beckett	Straight-to-DVD film
2016	The Shallows	Mr. Adams	
2018	The Riot Act	Dr. Willard Pearrow	
2018	Marriage: Impossible (Kedba Bidaa)	Steve	
2019	The Turkey Bowl	Ed Hodges	
2019	Joker	Thomas Wayne	
2021	Reminiscence	Walter Sylvan	
2022	American Carnage	Harper	
2022	It Snows All the Time	Paul	
2023	The Long Game	Judge Milton Cox	
2026	Kill Code	Sawyer	Post-production

=== Television ===
Year	Title	Role	Notes
1980	The Chisholms	Gideon Chisholm	Main role, 9 episodes Replaced Brian Kerwin from the preceding miniseries
1981	The Incredible Hulk	Joe Dunning	Episode: "The Phenom"
1982	M*A*S*H	Private Thomas Anthony McKegney	Episode: "Blood and Guts"
1983	The Thorn Birds	Bob Cleary	Television miniseries
1984	Eureka Stockade	Charles Ross	Television miniseries
1984	Single Bars, Single Women	Duane	Television film
1985	V: The Series	Robert	Episode: "The Littlest Dragon"
1985	Midas Valley	Brad Turner	Television film
1986	Samaritan: The Mitch Snyder Story	Billy	Television film
1986–1988	Falcon Crest	Dan Fixx	Main role (seasons 6–8); 53 episodes
1987	I'll Take Manhattan	Dennis Brady	Television miniseries
1988	Dead Solid Perfect	Donny Smithern	HBO television film
1989	Freddy's Nightmares	Carl	Episode: "Cabin Fever"
1989	Alfred Hitchcock Presents	Cooper	Episode: "Night Creatures"
1989	Tales from the Crypt	Ronnie Price	Episode: "Only Sin Deep"
1989–1990	The Young Riders	Sam Cain	Main role (season 1); 24 episodes
1990	The Image	Malcolm Dundee	HBO television film
1991	The Sitter	Jeff Harper	Television film
1991	...And Then She Was Gone	Peter Harmon	Television film
1992	Another Round	Roy	Television film
1992	Grapevine	Ken	Episode: "The Allison and Ken Story"
1993	Complex of Fear	Ed Wylie	Television film
1993	Mother of the Bride	Dennis Becker	Television film
1994	A Kiss Goodnight	Carl Jasper	Television film
1994	Keys	Police Chief Sam Wasser	Television film
1994	Diagnosis: Murder	Tim Rutland	Episode: "The Restless Remains"
1994	Matlock	Kevin Gilliam	Episode: "The Temptation"
1994	Gambler V: Playing for Keeps	The Sundance Kid	Television film
1994	Family Album	George Waterson (uncredited)	Television miniseries
1994	Star Trek: Deep Space Nine	Deral	Episode: "Meridian"
1995	The Omen	Jack	Failed TV pilot
1996	Shattered Mind	Sean	Television film
1997	Orleans	Clade Charbonnet	Main role; 8 episodes
1997	Something Borrowed, Something Blue	Pete	Television film
1997	Suddenly Susan	Adam	3 episodes
1997	Arliss	Ryan Mason III	Episode: "Kirby Carlisle, Trouble-Shooter"
1997	Perfect Body	Coach David Blair	Television film
1997	Ally McBeal	Professor James Dawson	Episode: "The Affair"
1997	The Hired Heart	Bryan	Television film
1998	From the Earth to the Moon	Dave Scott	Television miniseries; 3 episodes
1998	The Outer Limits	Dr. James Martin	Episode: "Final Exam"
1998	The Simple Life	Luke Barton	Main role; 7 episodes
1998	Legacy	Ned Logan	Main role; 18 episodes
2000	The Expendables	Deacon	USA Network television film
2001	Walker, Texas Ranger	Pete Drayton	Episode: "Justice for All"
2001	Once and Again	Bob Dimanjik	Episodes: "Armageddon" and "Won't Someone Please Help George Bailey Tonight"
2001	On Golden Pond	Charlie Martin	CBS television film
2001	Family Law	Dan Fortano	Episode: "Irreparable Harm"
2002	Without a Trace	Greg Pritchard / Peter Raymond	Episode: "Midnight Sun"
2002	Nancy Drew	Carson Drew	ABC television film
2003	Cold Case	Rob Deamer (2003)	Episode: "Gleen"
2004	Pixel Perfect	Xander	Disney Channel Original Movie
2004	Deceit	Sam Penny	Lifetime television film
2004	NTSB: The Crash of Flight 323	Hub Weber	ABC television film
2004	Life on Liberty Street	Dr. Jake Mitchell	Television film
2004	Suburban Madness	David Harris	CBS television film
2004	The Mountain	John "Whit" Whitman	Recurring role; 4 episodes
2004–2005	Desperate Housewives	Detective Burnett	Episodes: "Suspicious Minds" and "Children Will Listen"
2005–2006	The West Wing	Governor Ray Sullivan R-WV	Recurring role; 5 episodes
2005	Monk	James Duffy	Episode: "Mr. Monk and Little Monk"
2005	CSI: Miami	Michael Boland	Episode: "48 Hours to Life"
2005–2008	Lost	Goodwin Stanhope	Recurring role; 5 episodes
2006	Faceless	John Robson	FOX television film
2006	Pepper Dennis	Jack	Recurring role; 5 episodes
2006	NCIS	Captain Todd Gelfand	Episodes: "Hiatus: Part 1" and "Hiatus: Part 2"
2006	Ghost Whisperer	Jack Applewhite	Episode: "Melinda's First Ghost"
2006–2007	Ugly Betty	Ted LeBeau	3 episodes
2007	Friday Night Lights	Walt Riggins	4 episodes
2007	Burn Notice	Lawrence Henderson	Episode: "Wanted Man"
2007	Private Practice	Allan	Episode: "In Which Addison Finds a Showerhead"
2008	The Mentalist	Dane Kurtik	Episode: "Red Tide"
2009–2012	Make It or Break It	Mark Keeler	Recurring role; 18 episodes
2009	Damages	Wayne Sutry	Recurring role; 6 episodes
2009	Three Rivers	Carson	Episode: "Ryan's First Day"
2010	The Gates	Frank Buckley	Recurring role; 6 episodes
2010	Lone Star	Cooper Thomas	Episode: "Reverse"
2010	Justified	Gary Davis	1 episode
2010	90210	Mr. Sullivan	Episode: "Holiday Madness"
2011	Hallelujah	Sheriff Bob Clement	Television film
2011	Castle	Christian Dahl	Episode: "Poof, You're Dead"
2011	Body of Proof	Captain Perkins	Episode: "Shades of Blue"
2011–2016	Person of Interest	Nathan Ingram	Recurring role; 9 episodes
2012	White Collar	Agent Patterson	Episodes: "Diminishing Returns" and "Parting Shots"
2013–2015	Devious Maids	Michael Stappord	Series regular (seasons 1 & 3); 18 episodes
2014	Revenge	Jimmy Brennan	Episodes: "Hatred" and "Payback"
2014	Criminal Minds	Preacher Justin Mills	Episodes: "Angels" and "Demons"
2014–2015	Under the Dome	Don Barbara	Recurring role; 6 episodes
2015	Point of Honor	Ralston Rhodes	Amazon.com television film
2015	Stalker	Mayor Hayes	Episode: "Secrets and Lies"
2015	CSI: Crime Scene Investigation	John Nolan	Episode: "Under My Skin"
2016–2017	Narcos	Ambassador Arthur Crosby	Recurring role; 15 episodes
2017	Queen of the South	Cole Van Awken	Recurring role; 7 episodes
2019	True Detective	Gerald Kindt	Recurring role; 3 episodes
2019–2021	The Blacklist	The Stranger / Ilya Koslov / Frank Bloom	Recurring role; 8 episodes
2019–2020	Truth Be Told	Owen Cave	7 episodes
2020	Big Dogs	Captain McKeutchen	Main role; 8 episodes
2022	FBI	Curtis Grange	Episode: "Protective Details"
2022–2023	Winning Time: The Rise of the Lakers Dynasty	Bill Sharman	Main role; 17 episodes
2024	Law & Order: Special Victims Unit	Judge Leonard Andrews	Episode: "Excavation"
2026	Marshals	Harry Gifford	Recurring role; 7 episodes

== Awards and nominations ==
Year	Award	Category	Work	Result	Ref.
1998	Soap Opera Digest Awards	Outstanding Actor in a Supporting Role – Primetime	Falcon Crest	Nominated	
2019	LA February Awards	Best Actor	The Riot Act	Won	
2019	LA February Awards	Best Ensemble Cast	The Riot Act	Won	
