= Could Be Tonight =

Studio album by Hulvey
- Released: April 8, 2026
- Length: 52:12
- Label: Reach Records
- Producers: Alexander Papamitrou; John Michael Howell; Lasanna Harris; Micah Palace; Zac Lawson

Hulvey chronology
He Will Return (2025)	Could Be Tonight (2026)

Singles from Could Be Tonight
- 1. "Rooftop" Released: February 2, 2026; 2. "Automatic" Released: February 27, 2026; 3. "Dave" Released: March 20, 2026

Could Be Tonight (stylized in all caps) is the third studio album by the American Christian rapper Hulvey. The album was surprise-released on April 8, 2026, through Reach Records, to digital download formats, and on April 17, 2026 was released to CD, LP, and streaming formats. It features guest appearances from DC3, Torey D'Shaun, Kijan Boone, Drew, Nobigdyl, Connor Price, Keith Malonson, and Zahriya Zachary. The album peaked at number 12 on the Billboard Top Christian Albums chart.

Could Be Tonight was promoted with the release of three preceding singles, namely "Rooftop" on February 2, 2026, "Automatic" on February 27, 2026, and "Dave" on March 20, 2026. The lattermost charted on the Billboard Hot Christian Songs chart at number 32. The album was produced by I Project, John Michael Howell, Lasanna "ACE" Harris, Micah Palace, Alexander Papamitrou, and Zac Lawson, and features writing credits from Papamitrou, Bailey Unterwagner, Daniel Chenjerali, Dylan Alexander Phillips, Eric Lang, Hulvey, Isaac Thomas, Howell, Harris, Micah Palacio Spruance, Lawson, Torey D'Shaun, Kijan Boone, Thomas Vito Aiuto, Dennis Landeh, Drew, Emmy Lindeh, Malonson, Leif Vollebekk, Bobby Strand, Jessie Early, Michaela Gentile, and Zachary.

== Theme ==
The title of the album is a reference to the second coming of Jesus. Hulvey explained the inspiration behind the album's creation, saying:

2 years ago, I'm sitting at a red light. I randomly have the idea of making an album of Jesus' return, and then….. I didn't make it. Last summer I finally chose to sit down and make this album. And I haven’t experienced God lead my music so precisely since my debut project BRKNHRT. I thought I was writing this to the listener to be ready when Jesus returns but it turns out I was writing this for me.

== Release and promotion ==
At the 56th GMA Dove Awards in October 2025, Hulvey announced plans for an upcoming extended play later that month, as well as a forthcoming studio attempt scheduled for 2027. Subsequently, an extended play titled He Will Return was released on October 24, 2025. The "prophetic project" contained three tracks which would later be included on the full album, "He Will Return", "Survival", and "American Idolz". The extended play's title track was promoted with the release of a music video, which was uploaded to YouTube upon the extended play's release. Later that year, "American Idolz" and "Survival" were both promoted in the same way.

In January 2026, Hulvey announced that his third studio album would be his final release while being signed with Reach Records. He urged his social media followers to "presave the album" because "it could be tonight". The album was slated for release several months following its announcement. On February 2, 2026, the song "Rooftop" was announced for upcoming release, and made available for pre-order. It was released as the second single from Could Be Tonight on February 6, 2026. The album's third single, "Automatic", was released February 27, 2026. The song was promoted with the release of a music video, which was uploaded to YouTube. Following an announcement on March 13, 2026, the album's third and final single, "Dave", was released on March 20, 2026. The track was promoted with the release of a lyric video, which was uploaded to YouTube. With the release of "Dave", the tracklist and title was revealed for Could Be Tonight. Although the album was scheduled for release on April 17, 2026, it was released nine days prior, exclusively for purchase on Even. The album was sent to music streaming services on its original release date of April 17, 2026.

== Reception ==
Professional ratings
Review scores
Source	Rating
Jesus Freak Hideout	4.5/5 stars
Shatter the Standards	4/5 stars

=== Critical ===
Writing for Jesus Freak Hideout, Michael Carder wrote that Could Be Tonight "feels like [Hulvey's] magnum opus" due to its "melodic lines, thought-provoking rhymes, and top-notch production", and overall, describing it as "Hulvey at his best". He praised the album as being "what music should be: artists telling their stories in layered ways that don't fit in a box", and rated it 4.5/5. In a similar vein, Joshua Galla of New Release Today noted that the album is "[Hulvey's] best work of art", writing that "each track invokes passion, urgency, emotion, and a type of peace only our Lord can provide".

=== Commercial ===
Could Be Tonight contains one charted song, "Dave", which debuted at its peak of number 32 on the Billboard Hot Christian Songs chart on April 4, 2026. The album itself debuted at its peak of number 12 on the Top Christian Albums.

=== Accolades ===
Year	Organization	Category	Result	Ref.
2026	Dove Awards	Rap/Hip Hop Album of the Year	Pending	

== Track listing ==
All tracks stylized in all caps. All tracks are written by Alexander Papamitrou and Christopher Hulvey, and produced by Xander, unless otherwise noted.

No.	Title	Writer(s)	Producer(s)	Length
1.	"He Will Return"			2:16
2.	"Survival"	Papamitrou; Bailey Unterwagner; Hulvey		1:55
3.	"American Idolz" (with DC3)	Papamitrou; Hulvey; Daniel Chenjeraii		2:58
4.	"OCD"			1:33
5.	"Night Night" (with Torey D'Shaun)	Papamitrou; Hulvey; Torey D'Shaun		2:48
6.	"Young Rulers"			2:30
7.	"Signing Day"			1:52
8.	"Influencers"			3:20
9.	"Rich Like This" (with Kijan Boone)	Papamitrou; Hulvey; Kijan Boone		2:47
10.	"Dave"	Papamitrou; Hulvey; John Michael Howell; Micah Palace; Zac Lawson	Xander; Howell; Palace; ZVC	2:01
11.	"Down"	Papamitrou; Hulvey; Thomas Vito Aiuto		2:11
12.	"Speechless" (with Lin D and Drew)	Papamitrou; Hulvey; Dennis Lindéh; Drew; Ella Lindéh; Emmy Lindéh; Lasanna Harris	Xander; Harris^{[c]}	2:28
13.	"Rooftop" (with Nobigdyl)	Papamitrou; Hulvey; Dylan Alexander Phillips; Eric Yang; Harris		3:23
14.	"Automatic" (with Connor Price)	Papamitrou; Hulvey; Connor Price		2:08
15.	"Come Alive" (with Xander and Keith Malonson)	Papamitrou; Hulvey; Keith Malonson		4:07
16.	"Heroes"	Papamitrou; Hulvey; Leif Vollebekk		3:55
17.	"Separation"			1:56
18.	"Sky Priorities" (with Zahriya Zachary)	Papamitrou; Hulvey; Bobby Strand; Jessie Early; Michaela Gentile; Zahriya Zachary		2:50
19.	"Rachael's Interlude"			1:47
20.	"Forever Shine"			3:27
Total length:				52:12

=== Notes ===
- ^{^[c]} indicates a co-producer
- "Young Rulers", "Signing Day", "Influencers", "Rich Like This", and "Separation" are stylized with $ in place of the letter s (e.g., "Young Ruler$")
- "Sky Priorities" is stylized "$ky Priorities"

== Personnel ==
Credits adapted from Tidal.

- Xander – engineer (all tracks)
- Cameron Smith – additional vocals (2, 8, 12, 13, 20)
- Hulvey – engineer (all tracks)
- Connor Back – masterer (all tracks), mixer (all tracks)
- Connor Price – engineer (14)
- DC3 – engineer (3)
- Ethan Kent – additional vocals (8, 12, 13, 20), vocal director (8, 12, 13, 20)
- Jacob "Biz" Morris – masterer (all tracks), mixer (all tracks)
- John Michael Howell – engineer (10)
- Keith Malonson – saxophone (15)
- Kodoku – additional vocals (13)
- LJ – additional vocals (20)
- Marcelino Alfaro – additional vocals (2)
- Melody Dunlap – additional vocals (2)
- Micah Palace – engineer (10)
- Nai Washington – additional vocals (2, 8, 12, 13, 20)
- Nobigdyl – engineer (13)
- Ryan Brockington – additional vocals (8, 12, 13, 20)
- Tameka "Nikki" Sanford – additional vocals (2, 8, 12, 13, 20)

== Charts ==
Weekly chart performance for Could Be Tonight
Chart (2026)	Peak position
US Top Christian Albums (Billboard)	12

== Release history ==
Release history and formats for Could Be Tonight
Region	Date	Format(s)	Label(s)	Ref.
Various	April 8, 2026	Digital download	Reach Records	
Various	April 17, 2026	CD; LP; digital download; streaming	Reach Records	
