= No Longer Bound =

Single by Forrest Frank and Hulvey

from the album California Cowboy and Child of God
- Released: January 6, 2023
- Songwriters: Forrest Frank; Christopher Hulvey
- Producer: Forrest Frank

Forrest Frank singles chronology
"What's the use?" (2023)	"No Longer Bound" (2023)	"Ride" (2023)

Hulvey singles chronology
"Closer" (2022)	"No Longer Bound" (2023)	"Walk" (2023)

Music video
- "No Longer Bound" on YouTube

"No Longer Bound" is a song by American Christian contemporary musician Forrest Frank and Christian rapper Hulvey. It was released by River House Records on January 6, 2023. The song peaked at No. 19 on the Billboard Hot Christian Songs chart, and No. 46 on the 2023 year-end charts for the same chart. It was written by Forrest Frank and Christopher Hulvey, and produced by Forrest Frank. It was included on Frank's album California Cowboy in 2023, and later included on Child of God in 2024. The song is about breaking free from chains of personal failures.

The song was nominated in 2023 for the 54th GMA Dove Awards for Rap/Hiphop Recorded Song of the Year. That same year it was nominated for Mainstream Impact Award at the NewReleaseToday We Love Awards.

== Music video ==
The music video for "No Longer Bound" features different clips of people holding up paper or signs, with writing on it mentioning personal struggles or failures that they have experienced. They then flip over the sign to reveal a part that says they are "no longer bound" from whatever struggle they have had. Text at the beginning of the video states that they had created an alternative music video that involved more than 40 people and cost $10,000, but before release, "God told them to do something different". It is followed by saying that "this is his version". Then it cuts to the rest of the video.

== Maverick City Music version ==
On July 8, 2023, Maverick City Music released their version of the song, title "No Longer Bound (I'm Free)", with Frank and Chandler Moore. It was included on their 2023 album The Maverick Way Complete. The song peaked at No. 19 on the Billboard Hot Christian Songs chart.

== Track listing ==
No.	Title	Writer(s)	Length
1.	"No Longer Bound"	Forrest Frank; Christopher Hulvey	3:00
Total length:			3:00

Alternates
No.	Title	Writer(s)	Length
1.	"No Longer Bound" (sped up)	Forrest Frank; Christopher Hulvey	2:37
2.	"No Longer Bound" (slowed)	Frank; Hulvey	3:12
3.	"No Longer Bound" (instrumental)	Frank; Hulvey	2:53
Total length:			8:43

== Charts ==
=== Weekly ===
Weekly chart performance for "No Longer Bound"
Chart (2023)	Peak position
US Hot Christian Songs (Billboard)	19

Weekly chart performance for "No Longer Bound (I'm Free)"
Chart (2023)	Peak position
US Hot Christian Songs (Billboard)	19
US Hot Gospel Songs (Billboard)	5

=== Year-end ===
Year-end chart performance for "No Longer Bound"
Chart (2023)	Position
US Hot Christian Songs (Billboard)	44

Year-end chart performance for "No Longer Bound (I'm Free)"
Chart (2023)	Position
US Hot Christian Songs (Billboard)	73
US Hot Gospel Songs (Billboard)	24
