= Henry Gifford =

Henry or Harry Gifford may refer to:

- Harry Gifford (rugby league) (1884–1952), English rugby league player
- Henry Gifford (MP) (died 1592), MP for Stockbridge
- Sir Henry Gifford, 1st Baronet (died c. 1665) of the Gifford baronets
- Harry Gifford (songwriter) (1877–1960), English music hall and comedic songwriter
- Henry Gifford (literary scholar), formerly professor of English & comparative literature at the University of Bristol

== See also ==
- Gifford (disambiguation)
