= Abhi vs the Universe =

Studio album by Abhi the Nomad
- Released: 12 September 2021
- Genre: Alternative hip hop; pop rap; jazz rap
- Length: 33:54
- Label: UnderCurrent; Riptide Music
- Producer: Abhi the Nomad; Austin Marc; CARDS; Caye; Shane Doe; Sweaterbeats

Abhi the Nomad chronology
| Abhi vs Kato (2020) | Abhi vs the Universe (2021) | Abhi vs the Universe (Acoustic) (2022) |

Singles from Abhi vs the Universe
- 1. "Cable Car" / "Mexico" Released: 9 April 2021; 2. "Rockstar" / "Good Luck" Released: 28 May 2021; 3. "Bag" / "Close to You" Released: 30 July 2021

Abhi vs the Universe (sometimes abbreviated as AVU) is the third studio album by Indian rapper, singer, and songwriter Abhi the Nomad, released on 12 September 2021 by UnderCurrent and Riptide Music. It is an upbeat alternative hip hop record that features elements of pop and jazz music.

== Background ==
Abhi vs the Universe is Abhi the Nomad's first album to be released through UnderCurrent Entertainment, after he signed a deal with the label in 2020. Three singles were released prior to the album, each containing an A-side and a B-side. On 28 May 2021, "Rockstar" (with Kota the Friend) was released alongside "Good Luck"; however, Kota's verse is notably absent from the album, with the album version being disambiguated as "Rockstar (Solo Version)". "Good Luck" was the album's most successful single.

The album was released to mainly positive reviews. A limited-edition cassette tape of the album was produced in a small quantity and sold on Abhi the Nomad's Bandcamp page.

In December 2021, nearly three months after the release of AVU, a deluxe edition of the album was released on all platforms. It includes six additional tracks, offering additional features from Goodboy Noah, Louis Futon, Smle, TheBoyBeerus, and Chef Sherm.

The album spawned a twenty-stop tour entitled Abhi the Nomad: Universe Tour. The tour ran for just over two months from 18 September 2022, to 20 November 2022, and saw support from singer-songwriter and TikTok influencer Charlie Curtis-Beard.

On 3 April 2023, Abhi announced his fourth studio album, Abhi vs the Universe II: Heart of the Galaxy, which serves as a sequel to Abhi vs the Universe and was released on 25 August 2023.

== Track listing ==
All tracks are written by Abhi Sridharan Vaidehi, with additional songwriters noted.

Abhi vs the Universe – Standard edition
| No. | Title | Writer(s) | Length |
|---|---|---|---|
| 1. | "Extra Life" | | 3:02 |
| 2. | "Good Luck" | | 2:15 |
| 3. | "Critical" (featuring Cards) | | 2:36 |
| 4. | "Bag" (featuring Charlie Curtis-Beard) | Curtis-Beard | 1:52 |
| 5. | "Flowerbby" (featuring Pretty Sister) | Zak Waters | 3:04 |
| 6. | "Rockstar" (Solo Version) | | 2:07 |
| 7. | "Reason" (featuring McCaslin) | Brian McCaslin | 2:26 |
| 8. | "Cable Car" | | 2:38 |
| 9. | "Wasted" (featuring Harrison Sands) | Sands | 2:42 |
| 10. | "Oh Baby" | | 3:09 |
| 11. | "Mexico" (featuring Armani White) | Enoch Tolbert | 2:21 |
| 12. | "Close to You" | | 2:16 |
| 13. | "Circle" (featuring Johan Lenox) | Stephen Feigenbaum | 3:21 |
| Total length: | | | 33:54 |
