= K.Keed =

South African rapper

- Born: Mihlali Koyana; Gugulethu, Cape Town, Western Cape, South Africa
- Origin: Cape Town, Western Cape, South Africa
- Genre: Hip hop
- Occupation: Rapper
- Years active: 2019–present
- Labels: Gallo Record Company; Entertainment Lords; K.Keed Records

K.Keed (born Mihlali Koyana) is a South African hip hop artist and rapper. She began releasing music in 2019 and has since become a prominent figure in the South African rap scene, known for her aggressive delivery and collaborations with major local artists. Her notable releases include the 2022 EP ALTER-EGO and the 2025 album Bite the Bullet.

== Early life and education ==
Born as Mihlali Koyana, K. Keed was born and raised in the township of Gugulethu, Cape Town, Western Cape, South Africa. From a young age, she was drawn to poetry and began writing her own rhymes while still at school, inspired by the local hip-hop scene in Cape Town's townships. In 2025, she graduated at the University of The Western Cape.

== Career ==
=== 2019–2021: Breakthrough with “Similes” and Religion ===
K.Keed made her official recording debut in early 2019 with the single “Similes,” which garnered airplay on community radio and introduced her raw style to South African listeners. On 15 December 2020, she released her first full project, the seven-track album Religion, showcasing her versatility across trap and lyrical Hip-Hop.

=== 2022: ALTER-EGO EP ===
On 26 February 2022, K.Keed dropped ALTER-EGO, an eight-track EP featuring collaborations with Blxckie, Dee Koala and Indigo Stella. Standout singles “Spazz” (with Dee Koala) and “Cid” cemented her reputation as a rising star of the Mother City.

=== 2023-present: Mainstream ascendancy ===
- In November 2023, she teamed up with Orish for the single “uMgaranto.” She also collaborated with Scumie and Buzzi Lee for the trap song "Bank Account."
- In 2024, K.Keed released the single "YEAR 24," featuring Nasty C.
- On 28 February 2025, she released Bite the Bullet, a single featuring A-Reece, Priddy Ugly and Shekhinah. In 2025, she released album Bite the Bullet, featuring artists like A-Recce, Priddy Ugly and Shekhinah. By December 2024, K.Keed had become the most-streamed female Hip-Hop artist in South Africa.
- In March 2025, Apple Music’s Rap Life Africa show, hosted by Ebro Darden and Nandi Madida, spotlighted K.Keed as its featured artist, praising her bold lyricism and growing influence on the continent’s Hip-Hop landscape.

== Artistry and influences ==
K.Keed blends township slang, trap-driven production and confessional lyricism. Critics note her “unorthodox flow” and ability to switch between hard-hitting bars and melodic hooks. She has cited the DIY ethic of Cape Town’s underground scene and international artists like Nicki Minaj and Cardi B as inspirations for her stage persona.

== Awards and recognition ==
K.Keed has performed at The Boiler Room: Contemporary Scenes x Wear Broke and has been featured in Redbat's Young & Dope campaign. By the end of 2024, she was the most streamed female Hip-Hop artist in South Africa. In March 2025, K.Keed was featured as an artist for Apple Music's Rap Life Africa initiative.

== Discography ==
- Religion 2020
- Tx3 - Single 2021
- ALTER-EGO 2022
- uMgaranto 2023
- Bite the Bullet 2024
- Stru - Single 2024
