= Akintoye (rapper) =

Canadian rapper and TikToker

- Born: Akintoye Adeyemi Asalu; August 17, 1999 (age 27); Lagos, Nigeria
- Origin: Toronto, Ontario, Canada
- Genre: Hip hop
- Years active: 2019–present

TikTok information
- Page: yeahitsak
- Followers: 2.9 million
- Last updated: 2024-12-03

Akintoye Adeyemi Asalu (born August 17, 1999), known mononymously as Akintoye, is a Canadian rapper and social media personality. He gained prominence on TikTok, where he has almost 3 million followers as of May 2023 and has gone viral several times, including with the 2022 single "Pizazz". He has released five studio albums and been featured on songs with Charlie Curtis-Beard, Connor Price, and Idris Elba. Outside of music, he voices the recurring character of Anthony on the Disney Channel series Hamster & Gretel.

== Early life ==
Born in Lagos, Nigeria, Akintoye moved to Vaughan, Ontario, Canada at age nine, experiencing what he called a "little culture shock". His father, a fan of West Coast hip hop, would often sing the infant Akintoye to sleep with The Notorious B.I.G.'s "One More Chance". As a child, Akintoye sang in choir, took piano and flute lessons, and rapped and recorded videos, but was not initially passionate about music. At age ten, he volunteered to perform Drake's verse in the Young Artists for Haiti version of K'naan's "Wavin' Flag" for a middle school end-of-year concert, which sparked his desire to pursue rapping.

Akintoye attended McMaster University in Hamilton. He later said he was "dealing with a lot of anxiety" in university and used songwriting to "make sense of things and maintain my sanity."

== Career ==
Prior to joining TikTok, Akintoye had posted short rap videos to Instagram. While in university, he released his first album, Indecisive (2019), which has since been removed from streaming platforms; he later described this early music as "atrocious" and credited friend and bassist Daniel Vucko with helping him improve. He had begun playing local shows before the COVID-19 pandemic left him unable to do so.

Akintoye joined TikTok shortly before the COVID-19 pandemic, initially believing he was too old for the app but encouraged by the middle school students he was working with, as well as a friend who wanted to send him videos on the app. He first began making TikTok content in April 2020, participating in a rap challenge with a video that reached 10,000 views in one day. He subsequently began posting daily videos. Another song he posted, "I'm Broke", went viral in late 2021, receiving over 28.7 million views and 20,000 videos using the audio.

During Black History Month in February 2022, Akintoye was included on TikTok's second annual Black TikTok Trailblazers list and appeared on a billboard promoting TikTok at the Scotiabank Arena in Toronto. One of his videos, a freestyle of EarthGang's song "Billi", was noticed and duetted by EarthGang themselves, and he subsequently performed the song with the duo as an opener on their Biodeghettable Tour, one of several chosen by indie music blog Pigeons & Planes.

Akintoye gained wider mainstream attention in April 2022 with the single "Pizzazz". The song, about the rapper's struggles with anxiety and depression, was inspired by a TikTok commenter asking "Are you okay? Like really?", to which Akintoye responded, "I'm fine. If I'mma be sad, I'mma do it with pizzazz", which became the song's opening lines. "Pizzazz" was subsequently used in over 300,000 TikTok videos and surpassed 8 million streams on Spotify. That same month, Akintoye performed at Maple Leaf Square before a Toronto Raptors game.

Another single, "Ease Up", was released in June. The following August, Akintoye was featured on actor/rapper Connor Price's single "Aces", alongside Toronto Raptors DJ 4Korners and actor/singer Idris Elba. He released his fifth studio album, Anxiety & Circumstance, on September 2, 2022. In December, Complex included "Pizzazz" on their Best Canadian Songs of 2022 list and called Akintoye "the closest thing Canada had to a groundswell success story in 2022".

In March 2023, Akintoye released the single "Gentleman's Sweep", which had originally been included on his debut album Indecisive. Another single he released, "Beat It", drew criticism for a verse mocking Queen Elizabeth II shortly after her death, which he attributed to a conversation with friends about Nigeria's past as a British colony. He performed at Calgary's Sled Island Music and Arts Festival in June 2023, alongside Osees, Dehd, Helado Negro, Emma Ruth Rundle, Mannequin Pussy, Haviah Mighty, Spellling, Sumac, Liturgy, The Sun Ra Arkestra, Water from Your Eyes, Pelada, Pom Pom Squad, Gulfer, Kaina, and Sen Morimoto.

=== Other work ===
As of 2023, Akintoye voices the recurring character Anthony on the Disney Channel animated series Hamster & Gretel, including contributing the song "I Got Beef" to the show's soundtrack. In May 2023, he appeared in a documentary about his music, Mind Check 1-2, 1-2, which was directed by journalist Ian Keteku and co-produced by Lisa Rideout and premiered at the Hot Docs Canadian International Documentary Festival.

== Artistry ==
Akintoye's influences as a rapper include Joey Badass, J. Cole, Chief Keef, and Kendrick Lamar, who "drew from their trauma using metaphors and poetry", and 1990s New York rapper Big L, whom Akintoye called "so ahead of [his] time" and "one of the first people to craft stories from beginning to end for all his songs, all while maintaining a terrific technical skill set." His rapping style has been described by media outlets as "high-energy" and "bombastic", while The Brock Press described the instrumentals on Anxiety & Circumstance as "incredibly varied: from the mellow piano on 'Who Up,' to the funky bass-trumpet combo on 'Woosah,' to the harmonic choir on 'Glory'". CBC.ca described him as "maybe the most extroverted introvert out there" and "among a class of Canadian rappers dominating TikTok, like Freddie Dredd, bbno$ and Connor Price".

Akintoye has been noted for his candid lyrics about mental health, particularly depression and anxiety, often seen as atypical in hip-hop. The Toronto Star wrote that "While some styles of hip-hop tout braggadocio, Asalu opts for relatability, finding inspiration in such day-to-day trials as the dread that comes with the growing debt of unacknowledged text messages in 'Panic Attack.'" Akintoye has said, "I felt like I was born into the luckiest generation I could have been born into as far as hip hop goes, because nobody would have been trying to hear no bars about sadness, and anxiety and all these different types of things 10, 15 years ago." He has also rejected the notion that he is unique for addressing such topics in hip-hop: "All the greatest rappers — the Kendricks, the Coles, the Drakes, the Nases, the Tupacs, the Bigs — these are things they rapped about, just in their own particular way, and the way it relates to them [...] I'm not the first person to rap about anxiety or depression or mental health things. I'm just the first person to rap about my anxiety, and my depression and my mental health things."

Akintoye often performs live with a band alongside Dan Vucko (bassist), Alex Trent (saxophonist), Julian Antonini (guitarist), Samuel Lunguana (drummer), and Max Ghiabi (DJ).

== Personal life ==
Akintoye has asthma, which played a role in his decision to avoid touring during the COVID-19 pandemic. He has discussed having "a little bit of impostor syndrome" about his success, saying "Like when people see you on the phone, they think you're some big shot. And I'm like, I'm not; I'm the most regular, average person ever."

In May 2023, he told Toronto Life: "For a while, I struggled to share my writing because I didn't want to be judged. I had to unlearn the ridiculous notion that mental illness is weakness. But I realized that, if I shared my real thoughts in my songs for people to hear, that made me accountable and I had to deal with them. I don't want to be an inaccessible or mysterious artist. I'm more like that cousin you're excited to see at Christmas, who also happens to rap."

Akintoye often wears a satin bonnet in his TikTok videos, which has drawn some backlash due to the garment typically being worn by black women. He reportedly began wearing the garment during the pandemic when Canadian barbershops were shut down: "I needed something for my hair, and my mom actually offered me her bonnet. I slept in it one night, then recorded a TikTok the next morning and it ended up being my day-to-day look."

== Discography ==
=== Studio albums ===
| Title | Album details |
|---|---|
| Indecisive | Released: September 27, 2019 Label: Independent |
| Vibrate | Released: March 6, 2020 Label: Independent |
| Vertigo | Released: December 11, 2020 Label: Independent |
| Centrepiece | Released: July 23, 2021 Label: Independent |
| Anxiety & Circumstance | Released: September 2, 2022 Label: Independent |

=== Singles ===
| Year | Title | Album |
|---|---|---|
| 2019 | "Cruise Ship" | Vibrate |
| 2020 | "Resume" | Vertigo |
| 2020 | "Off My Back" | Vertigo |
| 2020 | "At the Cookout" | Vertigo |
| 2021 | "Feel" | Centrepiece |
| 2021 | "Overload" | Centrepiece |
| 2021 | "We Outside" | non-album single |
| 2021 | "Respectfully" | non-album single |
| 2022 | "The Line" | Anxiety & Circumstance |
| 2022 | "Pizzazz" | non-album single |
| 2022 | "Ease Up" | Anxiety & Circumstance |
| 2022 | "Bad Day Ballad" | Anxiety & Circumstance |
| 2022 | "It Ain't Easy" | Anxiety & Circumstance |
| 2023 | "ITB" | non-album single |
| 2023 | "Gentleman's Sweep" | non-album single |
| 2023 | "Beat It" | non-album single |
| 2023 | "Wallets & Pockets" | non-album single |
| 2023 | "Find Out (Boogie)" | non-album single |
| 2023 | "Impostor Syndrome" | non-album single |
| 2023 | "Fuck 'Em Up Moses" | non-album single |

=== Featured on ===
| Year | Title | Album | Label |
|---|---|---|---|
| 2019 | "Money Makes Us Animals" (Chantal ft. Akintoye) | non-album single | DSTM |
| 2019 | "Green Light" (Diafora ft. Akintoye) | non-album single | Independent |
| 2021 | "Blow My High" (Tyler Sweet ft. Akintoye) | Up From the Basement | ViCECiTY |
| 2021 | "Game Time" (Jaybreezy ft. Akintoye) | non-album single | Independent |
| 2021 | "Yin & Yang" (Double A-Ron ft. Akintoye) | Sincerely Aaron 2 | Double-A |
| 2021 | "Anime & Chardonnay" (Charlie Curtis-Beard ft. Akintoye) | Polaroids of Venice | UnderCurrent |
| 2021 | "You Suck <3" (Naethan Apollo ft. Akintoye) | non-album single | Independent |
| 2022 | "Rabbit Hole" (AVGUST ft. Akintoye) | non-album single | Independent |
| 2022 | "I Got Beef" (Various Artists ft. Akintoye) | Hamster & Gretel (Original Soundtrack) | Walt Disney |
| 2022 | "Aces" (Connor Price ft. 4Korners, Akintoye, Idris Elba) | non-album single | 4 of Clubs |

=== Music videos ===
| Year | Title | Director |
|---|---|---|
| 2021 | "Kidding" | Adit Dixit |
| 2021 | "Overload" | Adit Dixit |
| 2022 | "The Line" | Adit Dixit |
| 2023 | "ITB" | Adit Dixit |
| 2023 | "Gentleman's Sweep" | Adit Dixit |
| 2023 | "Beat It" | Adit Dixit |
| 2023 | "Fuck 'Em Up Moses" | Adit Dixit |

== Filmography ==
=== Television ===
| Year | Title | Role | Notes |
|---|---|---|---|
| 2023 | Zokie of Planet Ruby | Ghostly Figure | |
