= Manifest (urban arts festival) =

Manifest is an "urban art festival" put on by Columbia College Chicago to showcase the works of graduate students and seniors from the many departments of the college. Started in 2002, activities at Manifest include gallery shows, musical performances, screenings, readings, and various other activities and the whole event is open to the public. It is also a time when many of the clubs at Columbia promote themselves to returning students. In 2007, Manifest coincided, perhaps just by chance, with the premier of Looptopia in the downtown central business district known as the Loop. Manifest is always held on a Friday and past dates have included May 15, 2006, and May 11, 2007. Manifest 2008 was on May 16. Several large name groups have played at Manifest including Ozomatli in 2005, Lupe Fiasco in 2007, and OK Go in 2008. According to the official Columbia page, 30,000 people attended and participated in Manifest.
