= Caleb Gordon =

American singer

- Also known as: Cash G; YTM Cash
- Born: Caleb Henry Gordon I April 13, 2000 (age 26); Ocoee, Florida, U.S.
- Genres: Christian hip-hop; gospel
- Occupations: Singer; songwriter; record producer
- Years active: 2018–present
- Labels: Eden; Irish Town; River Town
- Member of: Transformation Worship
- Spouse: Valerin Gordon
- Website: calebfromeden.com

Caleb Henry Gordon I (born April 13, 2000) is an American rapper from Ocoee, Florida. He is best known for his 2024 singles "War" and "God Is Good" (with Forrest Frank), which peaked at numbers 24 and 8 on the Billboard Hot Christian Songs chart, respectively.

== Career ==
Caleb Gordon first began releasing secular music in 2018 while attending Ocoee High School under the stage name Cash G, and later YTM Cash. In 2020, he began releasing Christian music, after being converted to Christianity.

In 2021, Gordon released three studio albums, Before the Garden volumes 1–4. The first volume was released on March 28, 2021, the second on April 6, 2021, and the third released on April 20, 2021. Although no fourth volume was officially released, the fifth volume was released on June 9, 2023.

In 2024, Gordon released the single "War". It peaked at No. 24 on the Billboard Hot Christian Songs, becoming his first entry into the Billboard charts. "War" features a sample from the Bob Marley song of the same name, causing the song to be removed in October 2024 for copyright issues. The song was restored a week later.

== Discography ==
=== Studio albums ===
Title	Details
Christmas in Eden	Released: December 20, 2020; Label: Eden Records; Formats: Digital download, streaming
Before the Garden, Vol. 1	Released: March 28, 2021; Label: Caleb Gordon Music; Formats: Digital download, streaming
Before the Garden, Vol. 2	Released: April 6, 2021; Label: Caleb Gordon Music; Formats: Digital download, streaming
Before the Garden, Vol. 3	Released: April 20, 2021; Label: Caleb Gordon Music; Formats: Digital download, streaming
Christmas in Eden Vol. 2 Winter Wonderland	Released: December 3, 2021; Label: Eden Records; Formats: Digital download, streaming
Before the Garden, Vol. 5	Released: June 9, 2023; Label: Caleb Gordon Music; Formats: Digital download, streaming
War	Released: June 20, 2025; Label: Eden; Formats: Digital download, streaming

=== Extended plays ===
Title	Details	Peak chart positions
Title	Details	US Christ
Before the Garden 4 the Burden of Freedom	Released: January 5, 2023; Label: Caleb Gordon Music; Formats: Digital download, streaming	—
God Is Good (with Forrest Frank)	Released: April 12, 2024; Label: River House Records; Formats: digital download, streaming	5
Shhhh....	Released: May 16, 2025; Label: Eden Records; Formats: digital download, streaming	—
"—" denotes a recording that did not chart or was not released in that territory.

=== Charted singles ===
Title	Year	Peak chart positions		Album
Title	Year	US Christ	US Christ Stream	Album
"War"	2024	24	—	War
"God Is Good" (with Forrest Frank)	2024	18	25	God Is Good Child of God
"—" denotes a recording that did not chart or was not released in that territory.

== Awards and nominations ==
Year	Organization	Nominee/work	Category	Result	Ref.
2025	GMA Dove Awards	Caleb Gordon	New Artist of the Year	Nominated	
