= Brandon Keener =

American actor (born 1974)

- Born: October 1, 1974 (age 51); Fort Smith, Arkansas, U.S.
- Education: University of Arkansas at Little Rock
- Occupations: Actor, voice actor
- Years active: 1999–present
- Spouse: Elizabeth Barnes (m. 1996)
- Children: 2

Brandon James Keener (born October 1, 1974) is an American actor. He was born and raised in Fort Smith, Arkansas and graduated from University of Arkansas, where he won an Irene Ryan scholarship for collegiate actors and performed at the Kennedy Center.

Keener is best known for his voice-over roles in several video games, most notably that of former C-Sec officer Garrus Vakarian in the Mass Effect series, as well as ISAC from Tom Clancy's The Division, Detective Harold Caldwell in L.A Noire, the ADVENT Speaker in XCOM 2 and Tobias in Saints Row and Saints Row 2. He has also worked extensively in television and film. Keener has appeared in over 70 commercials, such as Skittles, Wink, BMW, FedEx, KFC, among many others.

== Filmography ==
=== Film ===
Year	Title	Role	Notes
1999	The Limey	Excited Guy	
1999	Galaxy Quest	Technician #2	
2000	Traffic	Tourist Man	
2001	Free	Bill Stein	
2002	Full Frontal	Francesca's Assistant	
2002	Catch Me If You Can	Pilot	
2003	Recipe for Disaster	Blind Date Guy	Television film
2003	Tahiti	Bailey	
2004	Single Santa Seeks Mrs. Claus	Commercial 1st AD	Television film
2004	Criminal	Waiter / Daniel	
2006	The Good German	Clerk	
2007	Mystery Woman: In the Shadows	Wes Bosworth	Television film
2007	Slice	Greg Altman	Short film
2007	Alter Ego	Superdude	Short film
2008	What Just Happened	Young Studio Executive	
2008	Beverly Hills Chihuahua	Waiter	
2009	He's Just Not That Into You	Jarrad	
2011	Zookeeper	Nimer	
2012	The Guilt Trip	Ryan McFee	
2014	Not Safe for Work	Moyers	
2014	The Purge: Anarchy	Warren Grass	
2014	Teenage Mutant Ninja Turtles	Newscaster	Uncredited
2014	Living the Dream	Johnny Gristecki	Television film
2015	Cocked	Breck	Television film
2016	Parker's Anchor	Andrew	
2017	Step Into: Miss Laura's	Gentry	Short film
2018	Madness, Farewell	Dr. Lorne	
2018	The Riot Act	William	
2019	Hustlers	Alpha	
2020	Run Sweetheart Run	Brett	
2020	Nocturne	David	
2022	Over/Under	Matt West	

=== Television ===
Year	Title	Role	Notes
1999	Undressed	Theo	Episode: "Unstripped"
2001	The Drew Carey Show	Scott	Episode: "Drew and the Activist: Part 2"
2002	Buffy the Vampire Slayer	Lance Brooks	Episode: "Him"
2003	The Guardian	Dan	Episode: "What It Means to You"
2004	NYPD Blue	Tim Semple	Episode: "You Da Bomb"
2005	Medium	Tim	Episode: "A Couple of Choices"
2005	Without a Trace	Deputy Fox	Episode: "The Bogie Man"
2006	Invasion	Air Force Lt. William Blount	Episode: "Re-Evolution"
2007	The King of Queens	Mitch	Episode: "Offensive Fowl"
2008	Raising the Bar	Sgt. Mike Crawford	Episode: "A Leg to Stand On"
2010	Justified	Mr. Ferguson	Episode: "Long in the Tooth"
2010	The Pacific	Charles Dunworthy	Episode: "Home"
2010	The Defenders	Leonard Jackson	Episode: "Nevada v. Cerrato"
2011	Body of Proof	Chris Quinn	Episode: "Love Bites"
2012	Castle	Charlie Coleman	Episode: "Undead Again"
2012	Criminal Minds	Jason Nelson	Episode: "The Pact"
2012	Suburgatory	Theo	Episode: "Friendship Fish"
2013	Revenge	Evan Spradlin	Episode: "Masquerade"
2013	Hart of Dixie	Tanner Hughes	Episode: "Help Me Make It Through the Night"
2014	CSI: Crime Scene Investigation	Owen Linder	Episode: "Consumed"
2014	Graceland	Leon	Episode: "The Line"
2014	NCIS: Los Angeles	Assistant U.S. Attorney Rick Sullivan	Episode: "SEAL Hunter"
2015	The Exes	Will Mullen	Episode: "Knotting Phil"
2015	Real Husbands of Hollywood	Producer	Episode: "Kevin Davis Jr."
2016	Agents of S.H.I.E.L.D.	Agent Harlan	Episode: "Lockup"
2017	Hawaii Five-0	Emilio	Episode: "Puka 'ana"
2017	Suits	Zander/Xander Epstein	Episode: "Pulling the Goalie" & "Inevitable"
2019	GLOW	Don	Episode: "Hollywood Homecoming"
2019–2021	PEN15	Mr. O	5 episodes
2021	9-1-1: Lone Star	Caleb Wilson	Episode: "Saving Grace"
2023	CSI: Vegas	Jason Ketchum	Episode: "Third Time's the Charm"
2023	The Rookie	Brian Cole	Episode: "S.T.R."
2023	Based on a True Story	Paul	4 episodes
2024–2025	The Sex Lives of College Girls	Coach Hale	4 episodes
2025	The Pitt	John Bradley	7 episodes
2025	Tracker	Cal Rodgers	Episode: "The Process"

=== Video games ===
Year	Title	Role
2005	EverQuest II	Additional Voices
2005	Getting Up: Contents Under Pressure	Additional Voices
2006	Full Spectrum Warrior: Ten Hammers	Additional Voices
2006	Saints Row	Tobias, Stilwater's Resident
2006	Company of Heroes	Additional Voices
2007	Mass Effect	Garrus Vakarian
2008	Saints Row 2	Tobias
2009	Company of Heroes: Tales of Valor	Frank Craft
2010	Mass Effect 2	Garrus Vakarian
2010	Company of Heroes Online	Allied Sniper, Additional Voices
2011	L.A. Noire	Detective Harold Caldwell
2012	Mass Effect 3	Garrus Vakarian
2013	The Bureau: XCOM Declassified	XCOM Agent
2014	Lightning Returns: Final Fantasy XIII	Additional Voices
2014	Skylanders: Trap Team	Additional Voices
2015	Halo 5: Guardians	Additional Voices
2015	Fallout 4	Sully Mathis, Drummer Boy, Rufus Rubins, Settlers, Railroad Agents, Initiates, Various
2016	XCOM 2	Advent Speaker
2016	Tom Clancy's The Division	ISAC
2016	Fallout 4: Far Harbor	Vault 118 Overseer, Harbormen, Synth Refugees, Radio Announcer
2016	Fallout 4: Nuka-World	Corporal Downey, Peter, Phil Roller, Pack Captives, Prisoners
2016	Mafia III	Additional Voices
2016	Dishonored 2	Howler
2016–17	The Walking Dead: A New Frontier	Paul "Jesus" Monroe
2017	Mass Effect: Andromeda	Additional Voices
2017	XCOM 2: War of the Chosen	Advent Speaker
2018	Red Dead Redemption 2	The Local Pedestrian Population
2019	Tom Clancy's The Division 2	ISAC
2023	The Elder Scrolls Online: Necrom	Sharp-As-Night
2023	Persona 5 Tactica	Salmael
2025	Avowed	Kai
Canceled	Tom Clancy's The Division Heartland	ISAC
