= The Riot Act (film) =

- Film poster
- Directed by: Devon Parks
- Written by: Devon Parks
- Starring: Brett Cullen; Connor Price; Brandon Keener; Micah Hauptman
- Release date: September 14, 2018
- Running time: 101 minutes
- Country: United States
- Language: English

The Riot Act is a 2018 American period thriller film.

The film stars Brett Cullen, Connor Price, Brandon Keener, and Micah Hauptman. It is the debut feature film from writer-director Devon Parks.

== Production ==
Principal photography finished in Arkansas in February 2018, and was released on September 14, 2018.

== Reception ==
Outtake Magazine said it "is as solid as many mass-produced period drama you are likely to get. It tries too hard, but Parks’ design props the film up just enough to make it worth sitting through until an expertly staged conclusion."
