= Henry Gifford (literary scholar) =

Charles Henry Gifford FBA (1913–2003) was an English comparative literature scholar.

Born in London on 17 June 1913, Gifford attended Harrow School before reading classics at Christ Church, Oxford (he graduated in 1936). During the Spanish Civil War, he worked with his wife Rosamund to assist refugee children, and learnt Spanish as a result. He then served in the Royal Armoured Corps from 1940 to 1946, during which time he taught himself Russian. In 1946, he was appointed to an assistant lectureship at the University of Bristol, where he was promoted to a senior lectureship in 1955 and a professorship in modern literature in 1963. He was made the Winterstoke Professor of English in 1967, succeeding L. C. Knights, and remained in that office until the end of 1975; from January to July 1976, he was professor of comparative literature. This last appointment recognised his work to pioneer the study of comparative literature at Bristol. He was elected a fellow of the British Academy in 1983 and died on 23 November 2003.

== Bibliography ==
- A Summer Mood (Oxford: Shakespeare Head, 1934)
- The Hero of His Time: A Theme in Russian Literature (London: Edward Arnold and Co., 1950)
- (ed. and trans. with Charles Tomlinson) Versions from Fyodor Tyutchev, 1903–1873 (London: Oxford University Press, 1960)
- (ed. and trans. with Charles Tomlinson) Castilian Ilexes: Versions from Antonio Machado, 1875–1939 (London: Oxford University Press, 1963)
- The Novel in Russia from Pushkin to Pasternak (London: Hutchinson University Library, 1964)
- Tolstoy: A Critical Anthology (Harmondsworth: Penguin, 1971)
- Pasternak: A Critical Study (Cambridge: Cambridge University Press, 1977)
- Tolstoy (Oxford: Oxford University Press, 1982)
- Poetry in a Divided World, Clark Lectures (Cambridge: Cambridge University Press, 1986)
