= Back to Tulsa – Live and Loud at Cain's Ballroom =

Back to Tulsa - Live and Loud at Cain's Ballroom

Live album by Cross Canadian Ragweed
- Released: October 31, 2006
- Recorded: July 14–15, 2006
- Venue: Cain's Ballroom
- Genre: Americana; Alternative country Country rock Southern rock Red dirt Texas country
- Length: 126:00 (CD); 85:00 (DVD)
- Label: Universal Records South

Cross Canadian Ragweed chronology
Garage (2005)	Back to Tulsa - Live and Loud at Cain's Ballroom (2006)	Mission California (2007)

Professional ratings
Review scores
Source	Rating
About.com	5/5 stars
This Is Texas Music	3.5/5 stars

Back to Tulsa – Live and Loud at Cain's Ballroom is the third live album by American rock band Cross Canadian Ragweed. It was released on October 31, 2006, as a double CD/DVD combo. It was recorded during two dates at Cain's Ballroom in Tulsa, Oklahoma in July, 2006.

== Track listing (CD) ==
=== Disc one ===
No.	Title	Lyrics	Length
1.	"Dimebag"	Cody Canada, Mike McClure	3:37
2.	"Number"	Canada, Stoney LaRue, Edmondson	3:47
3.	"Lonely Girl"	Canada	4:24
4.	"Late Last Night"	Todd Snider	5:00
5.	"Final Curtain"	Canada	5:27
6.	"Sister"	Canada	5:48
7.	"Constantly"	Canada	4:22
8.	"Don't Need You"	Canada	4:57
9.	"Fightin' For"	Canada, McClure	3:58
10.	"When It All Goes Down" (duet with Wade Bowen)	Canada, Bowen	4:26
11.	"Anywhere But Here"	Canada, Plato	8:07
12.	"Daddy's at Home"	Randy Ragsdale	3:59
13.	"The Needle and the Damage Done"	Neil Young	2:01
14.	"When Will It End" (duet with Stoney LaRue)	Canada, LaRue	4:16
15.	"Back Around"	Canada, Roberson	4:16
16.	"Brooklyn Kid"	Canada	4:11
Total length:			1:13:45

=== Disc two ===
No.	Title	Lyrics	Length
1.	"Cold Hearted Woman"	Canada, McClure	4:44
2.	"Jimmy and Annie"	Canada, LaRue	3:45
3.	"Wanna Rock & Roll"	Ray Wylie Hubbard	15:19
4.	"17"	Canada, Jason Boland	5:51
5.	"Hammer Down"	Canada	4:21
6.	"Alabama"	Canada, Roberson	5:14
7.	"Blues for You"	Canada, LaRue	5:31
8.	"Lonely Feeling"	Robert Earl Keen	8:11
9.	"Take Me Back to Tulsa" (hidden track)	Bob Wills	4:46
Total length:			52:15

== Track listing (DVD) ==
No.	Title	Length
1.	"Late Last Night"	4:28
2.	"Fightin' For"	3:14
3.	"Don't Need You"	4:56
4.	"Number"	3:37
5.	"Dimebag"	3:21
6.	"Final Curtain"	5:14
7.	"Lonely Girl"	4:03
8.	"Constantly"	4:41
9.	"Sister"	5:47
10.	"Anywhere But Here"	7:41
11.	"Back Around"	5:09
12.	"Cold Hearted Woman"	4:39
13.	"Blues for You"	5:25
14.	"Alabama"	4:46
15.	"Hammer Down"	3:46
16.	"Wanna Rock & Roll"	14:57
Total length:		1:25:44

== Personnel ==
- Cody Canada - lead vocals, lead guitar, harmonica
- Jeremy Plato - bass guitar, background vocals
- Grady Cross - rhythm guitar
- Randy Ragsdale - drums, lead vocal & guitar on "Daddy's at Home"

== Chart performance ==
Chart (2006)	Peak position
U.S. Billboard Top Country Albums	27
U.S. Billboard 200	120
