= Mission California =

Studio album by Cross Canadian Ragweed
- Released: October 2, 2007
- Recorded: March 2007
- Genres: Southern Rock; Country Rock; Americana; Alternative Country; Red Dirt; Texas Music.
- Length: 54:11
- Label: Universal South
- Producers: Mike McClure & Cross Canadian Ragweed

Cross Canadian Ragweed chronology
Back to Tulsa - Live and Loud at Cain's Ballroom (2006)	Mission California (2007)	Happiness and All the Other Things (2009)

Professional ratings
Review scores
Source	Rating
AllMusic	3.5/5 stars
This Is Texas Music	3/5 stars

Mission California is Cross Canadian Ragweed's fourth studio album. It was released on October 2, 2007. The band spent 25 days in the studio; the first 5 cutting 15 tracks, the next 20 polishing each. It was recorded in San Diego, California. Lee Ann Womack laid down background vocals on 4 of the tracks to include the Chris Knight cover "Cry Lonely."

== Overview ==
The first single from Mission California was "I Believe You," which is a Todd Snider cover. The single charted as high as #4 on the Texas Music Chart. According to iTunes, the most popular and downloaded song was the song "In Oklahoma". Also bassist Jeremy Plato took lead vocals for the first time on the Scott Evans penned song "Soul Agent." The track "Jenny" was a second recording of the song, as it had been recorded on the band's 1998 debut album, Carney.

The album debuted at number 30 on the U.S. Billboard 200 chart and #6 on the Top Country Albums chart. It sold about 23,000 copies in its first week.

== Track listing ==
1. "Record Exec" (Cody Canada) - 3:07
2. "Dead Man" (Canada) - 4:48
3. "The Deal" (Canada, Mike McClure) - 2:38
4. "Lawrence" (Canada) - 5:03
5. "In Oklahoma" (Canada, Stoney LaRue) - 3:07
6. "Cry Lonely" (Chris Knight, Gary Nicholson) - 4:12
7. "Smoke Another" (Canada, McClure) - 2:01
8. "Soul Agent" (Scott Evans) - 4:29
9. "Walls To Climb" (Canada) - 3:15
10. "The Years" (Canada) - 4:25
11. "Jenny" (Canada, Mike Shannon) - 4:43
12. "I Believe You" (Todd Snider) - 4:04
13. "NYCG" (Canada, McClure, Anthony Aquino) - 8:19

Hidden Track: "On The Right Path" begins at 6:15 on "NYCG"

== Personnel ==
- Cody Canada - lead vocals, lead guitar, rhythm guitar, acoustic guitar, baritone guitar, slide guitar, harmonica
- Jeremy Plato - lead vocals & harmony vocals, bass guitar, cello
- Grady Cross - rhythm guitar, acoustic guitar, baritone guitar
- Randy Ragsdale - drums, percussion
- Lee Ann Womack - harmony vocals
- Mike McClure - additional lead guitar & rhythm guitar, background vocals
- Adam Odar - accordion

== Chart performance ==
Chart (2007)	Peak position
U.S. Billboard Top Country Albums	6
U.S. Billboard 200	30
