= Take Me Back to Tulsa =

Single by Bob Wills and His Texas Playboys
- B-side: "New Worried Mind"
- Released: March 1941
- Recorded: February 26, 1941
- Studio: WBAP Studio, Blackstone Hotel, Fort Worth, Texas
- Genre: Western swing
- Label: Okeh 06101
- Songwriters: Bob Wills, Tommy Duncan

Bob Wills and His Texas Playboys singles chronology
"Big Beaver" (1940)	"Take Me Back to Tulsa" (1941)	"Maiden's Prayer" (1941)

"Take Me Back to Tulsa" is a Western swing standard song. Bob Wills and Tommy Duncan added words and music to the melody of the traditional fiddle tune "Walkin' Georgia Rose" in 1940. The song is one of eight country music performances selected for the Rock and Roll Hall of Fame's "500 Songs that Shaped Rock and Roll".

== Song ==
"Take me Back to Tulsa" originated as a Bob Wills fiddle tune and was so popular at shows that Wills and his singer Tommy Duncan added words and recorded it in early 1941. The original recording features one of Western swing's greatest bands in full flight.

Musically, the song has been described as a "jubilant Western swing romp," with Wills urging fiddler Louis Tireney to "turn it on boy, turn it on" halfway through the song. Wills's organization was based in Tulsa from 1934 to 1942, and the song takes its name from the chorus: "Take me back to Tulsa, I'm too young to marry." Lyrically, the song is a series of unrelated, mostly nonsense, rhyming couplets. One was:

Little bee sucks the blossom, big bee gets the honey.
Darkie raise the cotton, white man gets the money.

Wills changed the last quoted line in 1946 to: "Little man raise the cotton, beer joints get the money." (Modern covers of the song have tended to use the line: "Poor boy picks the cotton, Rich man gets the money"). Asked about those lines, Wills said they were just nonsense lyrics that he had learned as a youth. Though Wills did not know its origin, the couplet actually derives from a 19th-century song of enslaved African Americans, a version of which also appeared in print in the 1880 novel My Southern Home by William Wells Brown. Wills had known few whites outside his immediate family as a young child.

When played at Cain's Ballroom in Tulsa and other venues, the song often included the lines:

Would I like to go to Tulsa? Boy, I sure would.
Well, let me off at Archer, and I'll walk down to Greenwood.

Bob Wills and the Texas Playboys recorded "Take Me Back to Tulsa" on February 26, 1941, at the Blackstone Hotel, Fort Worth, Texas, (OKeh 6101) and it became one of their larger hits. They had previously performed the song in Will's 1940 movie Take Me Back to Oklahoma. Spade Cooley's Western Dance Gang also performed it in their 1944 short movie Take Me Back to Tulsa. The song has been recorded by many other artists over the years.

Al Dexter, whom Wills influenced, is sometimes erroneously credited with writing "Take Me Back to Tulsa", perhaps by comparison with his musically similar hit song "Pistol Packin' Mama".

== Covers ==
Merle Haggard recorded a cover of the song for his 1970 album A Tribute to the Best Damn Fiddle Player in the World (or, My Salute to Bob Wills).

The country music group Asleep at the Wheel covered the song on their 1973 album Comin' Right at Ya.

George Strait did a cover of the song on his 2003 live album For the Last Time: Live from the Astrodome.

The red dirt band Cross Canadian Ragweed performed a backstage cover of the song, released on their 2006 live album Back to Tulsa – Live and Loud at Cain's Ballroom.
