= Soul Gravy =

Studio album by Cross Canadian Ragweed
- Released: March 9, 2004
- Genre: Rock; Southern rock Country rock Alternative country Red Dirt; Texas Country
- Length: 56:50
- Label: Universal South
- Producer: Mike McClure; Cross Canadian Ragweed

Cross Canadian Ragweed chronology
Cross Canadian Ragweed (Purple) (2002)	Soul Gravy (2004)	Garage (2005)

Singles from Soul Gravy
- 1. "Sick and Tired" Released: February 23, 2004; 2. "Alabama" Released: October 2004

Professional ratings
Review scores
Source	Rating
Allmusic	link

Soul Gravy is the second studio album by the American rock/alternative country band Cross Canadian Ragweed, released in 2004 on Universal South Records. It features the singles "Sick and Tired" (a collaboration with Lee Ann Womack) and "Alabama", both of which charted on the Hot Country Songs charts. "Alabama" had been re-recorded from their second studio album, Highway 377 (2001).

Original, limited edition presses of the album featured a concert DVD as well.

== Track listing ==
All songs written by Cody Canada except where noted.

1. "Number" (Cody Canada, Stoney LaRue) – 3:35
2. "Again" (Canada, Randy Rogers) – 2:48
3. "Lonely Girl" – 3:54
4. "Cold Hearted Woman" (Canada, Mike McClure) – 3:55
5. "Sick and Tired" – 4:32
  - feat. Lee Ann Womack
6. "Hammer Down" – 3:38
7. "Flowers" – 2:36
8. "Leave Me Alone" – 3:51
9. "Down" – 3:38
10. "Wanna Rock & Roll" (Ray Wylie Hubbard) – 5:16
11. "Alabama (New Version)" (Canada, Ted Roberson) – 4:05
12. "Pay" – 3:29
13. "Too Far Gone" (Canada, McClure) and hidden track "Stranglehold" (Ted Nugent) – 11:33

== DVD listing ==
1. "Anywhere but Here"
2. "Suicide Blues"
3. "17"
4. "Hammer Down"
5. "Carry Your Home"
6. "Freedom"
7. "Constantly"
8. "Walls of Huntsville"
9. "Brooklyn Kid"
10. "Boys from Oklahoma"
11. "Long Way Home"
12. "42 Miles"
13. "Don't Need You"
14. "Alabama"
15. "Carney Man"
16. "Bang My Head"

== Personnel ==
=== Cross Canadian Ragweed ===
- Cody Canada - lead vocals, lead guitar
- Grady Cross - rhythm guitar
- Jeremy Plato - bass guitar, background vocals
- Randy Ragsdale - drums, percussion

=== Additional musician ===
- Steve Palousek - Dobro ("Down")

== Chart performance ==
Chart (2004)	Peak position
U.S. Billboard Top Country Albums	5
U.S. Billboard 200	51
