= The Red Dirt Album =

Studio album by Stoney LaRue
- Released: August 23, 2005
- Genre: Red dirt; Texas country
- Label: Smith Music Group
- Producer: Mike McClure

Stoney LaRue chronology
| Downtown (2002) | The Red Dirt Album (2005) | Live at Billy Bob's Texas (2007) |

Professional ratings
Review scores
| Source | Rating |
|---|---|
| AllMusic | 4/5 stars |

The Red Dirt Album is an album by Stoney LaRue. It was released in August 2005. The song "Down in Flames" was co-written by Brandon Jenkins recorded on his 2004 album, Down in Flames. The song "Forever Young" was written by Bob Dylan and recorded on his 1974 album, Planet Waves.

== Track listing ==
1. "Down in Flames" (Stoney LaRue, Brandon Jenkins) – 3:52
2. "Closer To You" (LaRue, Scott Evans) – 3:10
3. "Idabel Blues" (John Cooper, David Clark, Charles Peaden) – 4:25
4. "Downtown" (LaRue) – 3:54
5. "Solid Gone" (LaRue, Ray Wylie Hubbard) – 3:03
6. "Walk Away" (LaRue, Cody Canada) – 3:37
7. "Texas Moon" (LaRue, Wehmeyer, Wood, James) – 4:11
8. "One Chord Song" (LaRue, Bob Childers) – 3:07
9. "Bluebird Wine" (Rodney Crowell) – 3:59
10. "Let Me Hold You" (LaRue, Mike McClure) – 3:39
11. "Forever Young" (Bob Dylan) – 4:32

== Personnel ==
- Mike Byars – drums
- Cody Canada – baritone guitar
- Scott Evans – background vocals
- Eric Hansen – drums
- Mike McClure – acoustic guitar, electric guitar, background vocals
- Steve Palousek – electric guitar, steel guitar, dobro, lap steel guitar
- Jeremy Plato – bass guitar
- Rodney Pyeatt – baritone guitar
- Stoney LaRue – lead vocals, acoustic guitar
- Milton Waters – Hammond B-3 organ
- Jeremy Watkins – fiddle, background vocals
- Kevin Webb – acoustic guitar, bouzouki, electric guitar

== Chart performance ==
| Chart (2005) | Peak position |
|---|---|
| U.S. Billboard Top Country Albums | 70 |
