= Garage (album) =

Studio album by Cross Canadian Ragweed
- Released: October 4, 2005
- Genre: Rock; Southern Rock; Country rock Alternative Country; Red Dirt; Texas Country
- Length: 65:01
- Label: Universal South
- Producer: Mike McClure

Cross Canadian Ragweed chronology
Soul Gravy (2004)	Garage (2005)	Back to Tulsa – Live and Loud at Cain's Ballroom (2006)

Professional ratings
Review scores
Source	Rating
Allmusic	3.5/5 stars

Garage is the third studio album by American country rock group Cross Canadian Ragweed. A limited release special edition included a bonus DVD containing six videos, one chronicling the band's 10th anniversary. The album includes the singles "Fightin' For" and "This Time Around", both of which charted on Hot Country Songs. The album also produced the song "Dimebag", a tribute to former Damageplan guitarist Darrell Abbott, who had been killed during a performance earlier in the year. The single, along with "Fighting For" both saw air time on classic rock stations in both Texas and Oklahoma. Lead singer Cody Canada agreed, saying that Garage was "our grungiest album so far......we named it Garage because we wanted to make a record that sounded like a garage rock band."

== Track listing ==
No.	Title	Writer(s)	Length
1.	"Fightin' For"	Cody Canada, Mike McClure	3:22
2.	"After All"	Canada	4:28
3.	"Dimebag"	Canada, McClure	3:20
4.	"Breakdown"	Canada	4:50
5.	"Sister"	Canada, Stoney LaRue	5:28
6.	"When It All Goes Down"	Wade Bowen, Canada	4:16
7.	"Final Curtain"	Canada	5:16
8.	"Late Last Night"	Todd Snider	3:33
9.	"Blues for You"	Canada, Stoney LaRue	4:11
10.	"SS #10"	Canada, Grady Cross, Jeremy Plato, Randy Ragsdale	4:09
11.	"Lighthouse Keeper"	Scott Copeland	4:39
12.	"This Time Around"	Canada, Randy Rogers	3:47
13.	"Who Do You Love"	Bo Diddley	4:35
14.	"Bad Habit"	Canada	9:07 (includes an untitled hidden track of recording session outtakes)

== Chart performance ==
Chart (2005)	Peak position
U.S. Billboard Top Country Albums	6
U.S. Billboard 200	37
