= Boone Pickens Stadium =

Stadium at Oklahoma State University

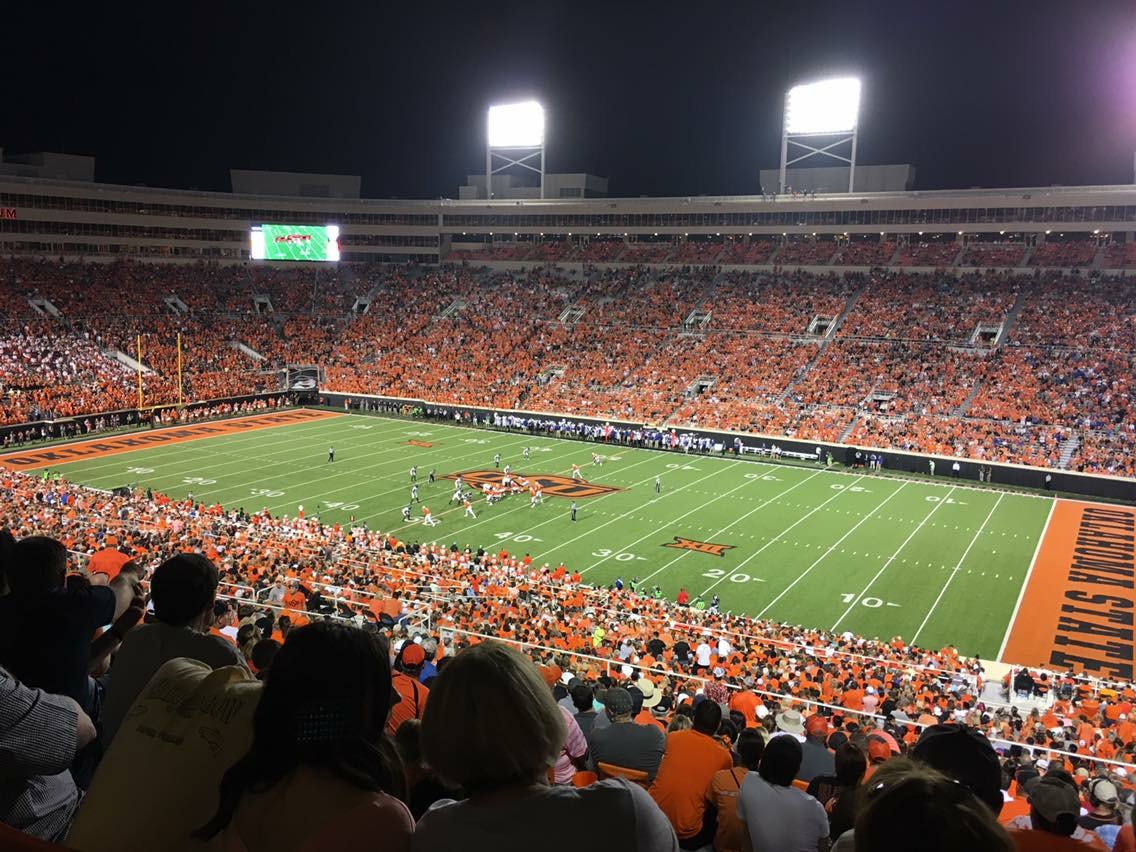
- View from southeast at 2017 opener

- Location within the United States Location within Oklahoma
- Former names: Lewis Field (1920–2002)
- Address: 700 W. Hall of Fame Ave.
- Location: Oklahoma State University; Stillwater, Oklahoma, U.S.
- Coordinates: 36°7′33″N 97°3′59″W
- Elevation: 900 feet (275 m) AMSL
- Owner: T. Boone Pickens
- Operator: Oklahoma State University
- Capacity: 52,305 (present); 56,790 (2017–2018); 60,218 (2009–2016); 60,000 (2008); 44,700 (2007); 43,500 (2006); 48,000 (2005); 47,800 (2004); 48,500 (1999–2003); 50,614 (1993–1998); 50,440 (1972–1992); 39,000 (1950–1971); 30,000 (1947–1949); 13,000 (1930–1946); 8,000 (1920–1929)
- Surface: FieldTurf Vertex CORE (2022-present); AstroTurf 3D Decade (2013–2022); Desso Artificial Grass (2005–2013); Astroplay (2000–2004); AstroTurf (1972–1999); Natural grass (1920–1971)
- Record attendance: 60,218

Construction
- Groundbreaking: 1920
- Opened: October 2, 1920; 105 years ago
- Renovated: 2003–2009
- Expanded: 1924, 1929, 1947, 1950, 1971, 2009
- Cost: $50,000 ($803,571 in 2025 dollars) $286 million (renovation) ($429 million in 2025 dollars)
- Architect: Gary Sparks (Renovation) Crafton Tull Sparks

Tenants
- Oklahoma State Cowboys (NCAA) (1920–present); Orange Peel Concert (1996–2006)

Boone Pickens Stadium (previously known as Lewis Field) is a college football stadium in the south central United States, located on the campus of Oklahoma State University in Stillwater, Oklahoma. It has been home to OSU Cowboys football in rudimentary form since 1919, and as a complete stadium since 1920. With an unorthodox east–west alignment since 1920, the field is the oldest in the Big 12 Conference.

With the resurgence of Cowboy football, sparked by consecutive victories over the rival Oklahoma Sooners in the annual Bedlam Series in 2001 and 2002, followed by a win in the Houston Bowl, interest grew for a major overhaul of Lewis Field. An ambitious fund-raising project for the renovation dubbed "The Next Level" became the flagship effort of the Oklahoma State athletic department.

The stadium has a seating capacity of 53,885.

== The "Lewis Field" era ==
Oklahoma State, then known as Oklahoma A&M, first began playing at what would become the original Lewis Field in 1901. Located just north of Morrill Hall and originally known simply as "Athletic Field," it was renamed Lewis Field in 1914 after Lowery Laymon Lewis, a former dean of veterinary medicine and science and literature and one of the most popular figures in the school's history. In addition to his duties as dean and instructor at OAMC, Lewis served as the school's acting president in 1914. Under his brief administration, OAMC established the first school of commerce and marketing in the nation and developed experimental stations around the state. In addition to naming the field after him, the students also dedicated the 1914 yearbook, its first, to Lewis.

Lewis Field was relocated to its current site at Boone Pickens Stadium for the 1919 season, following a traditional north–south orientation. In 1920, the school constructed a wooden 8,000-seat grandstand, which approximately corresponds to the lower level of the current facility's north grandstand. The field's orientation was adjusted to an east–west direction to mitigate the impact of strong prevailing winds. It stands as one of only a few major stadiums in the United States with goals positioned at both the east and west ends. Notably, it is the lone stadium with this orientation within the Big 12. As a result, the sun provides a strategic advantage to the team defending the west end zone during sunny afternoon games, while the team defending the east goal must contend with direct and intense sunlight glare.

The university planned to build a horseshoe-shaped stadium, similar to Ohio State University's Ohio Stadium, in the 1920s to be called War Memorial Stadium. These plans were scrapped before any construction of the proposed stadium started, and the first addition to Lewis Field came in 1924 with the first steel and concrete portion of the current stadium built on the south side. During the 1929–1930 seasons, 8,000 permanent seats were built on the north side for an overall capacity of 13,000. In 1947 the south stands were increased from 20 to 53 rows and capacity climbed to nearly 30,000. For the first time, a permanent press box was then added.

Prior to the 1950 season, 10,600 seats were added to the north stands, increasing capacity to 39,000 (including temporary endzone bleachers). After the 1971 season the cinder track was removed, lowering the field 12 feet and making the space between the field and the stadium retaining walls among the smallest in college athletics. Twenty rows of permanent seats were also added to both sides of the stadium. This expansion, including a complete conversion to an artificial turf playing surface, cost $2.5 million and was financed through private donations.

Press box construction was completed in 1980 for $1.8 million. The press box has seating for more than 200 members of the print media, with separate levels for radio/television broadcasters, photographers and VIP seating on the first level capable of handling 300. A lighting system for night games was installed in time for the 1985 season and cost approximately $750,000.

The all-time attendance record for Lewis Field is 51,458 for the Bedlam Series game in 1979.

On August 7, 1976, the field hosted a National Football League (NFL) exhibition game between the Cleveland Browns and the Atlanta Falcons. The field also hosted the Oklahoma Outlaws and the Houston Gamblers of the United States Football League (USFL) in 1984. Due to a conflict at Tulsa's Skelly Stadium, the Outlaws were forced to play their last Exhibition game in Stillwater, losing to the visiting Gamblers by a score of 34–7. Only 6,120 attended the cold February 19 game.

== Boone Pickens and "The Next Level" ==
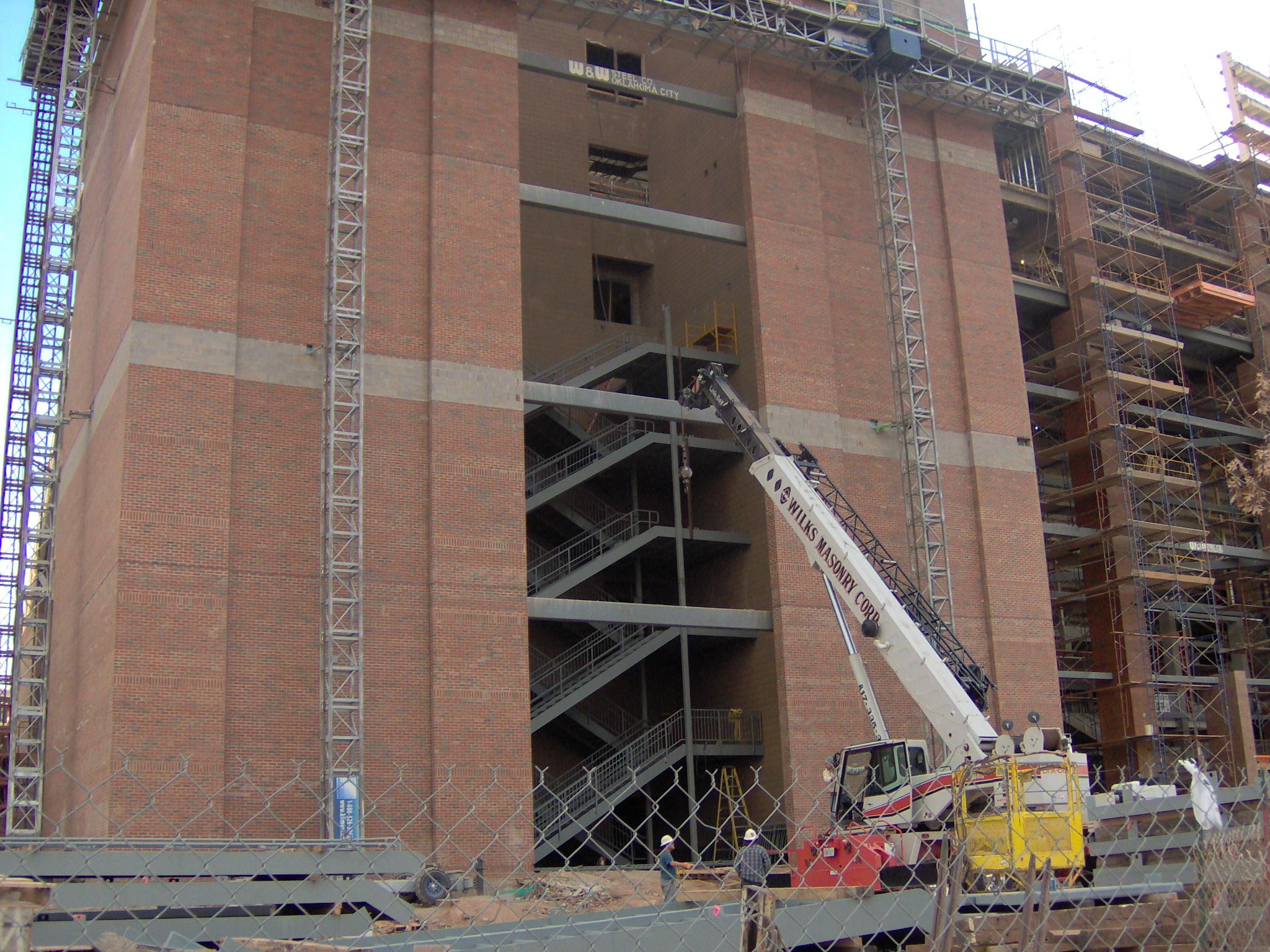
Construction work at Boone Pickens Stadium in February 2006

Lewis Field was officially renamed Boone Pickens Stadium during a halftime ceremony at the 2003 football game versus the University of Wyoming. The stadium's name was changed to honor OSU alumnus T. Boone Pickens, a Texas oilman and entrepreneur who founded Mesa Petroleum Company in 1956 and served as its CEO from 1956 to 1996. Pickens donated $165 million overall to the university, the largest single donation for athletics to an institution of higher education in American history, to create an “athletic village” on campus, but the construction of the village was postponed due to the economy's downturn.

Pickens' gift helped build the west end zone at Boone Pickens Stadium, a multi-purpose indoor practice complex, new soccer, track and tennis facilities, a new equestrian center, a new baseball stadium (completed in 2020) and new outdoor practice fields. During the 2003 football season, OSU broke ground on a $260 million upgrade to Boone Pickens Stadium which included a brick exterior to match the modified Georgian architecture of the OSU campus, and a connection to the Gallagher-Iba Arena. The stadium turf was replaced in 2005. Boone Pickens Stadium was the second NCAA Division I Football Bowl Subdivision (FBS) venue to install the Desso Sport System's Football Pro Artificial Grass Surface. The first installation was at University of Wyoming's War Memorial Stadium, also in 2005.

The funds used for the expansion of the stadium have been a topic of controversy and discussion among students and the public, including the city of Stillwater. The athletic village came under intense scrutiny within the community and garnered statewide attention. In 2005 and 2006, OSU held "town hall meetings" to allow members of the community to express their concerns. At one meeting in the Stillwater Public Library, Commissioner Hank Moore told then-OSU President David Schmidly, the meeting's moderator, that OSU's actions in implementing the athletic village under the Campus Master Plan contradicted the principles of democracy.

Another hotly contested issue between the Stillwater city commissioners and OSU administrators was the closing of Hall of Fame Avenue, the street running parallel with the north side of the stadium. At the same meeting, Moore said OSU broke a trust agreement with the city on the closing of the street. In January 2007, an agreement was reached regarding Hall of Fame Avenue granting the city ownership, which could revert to OSU if the city opens a roadway specifically to replace it.

During Spring Commencement exercises at the stadium on May 6, 2006, President George W. Bush gave the commencement address, becoming the third U.S. president to speak at an OSU commencement (following George H. W. Bush and Richard Nixon).

== Official rededication ==
The stadium was officially re-dedicated as Boone Pickens Stadium on Sept. 5, 2009, when the #9 Cowboys opened the fall football season against #13 Georgia Bulldogs. Prior to the game, there was a grand-opening ceremony outside the stadium. On hand for the ribbon-cutting were coach Mike Gundy, university president Burns Hargis, athletic director Mike Holder and Boone Pickens. Attendance for the game was 53,012, which was a new Oklahoma State Football attendance record surpassing the 52,463 from the 2008 meeting with Troy University.

== Attendance records ==
With their success on the football field under Mike Gundy, the Cowboys have set numerous attendance records at Boone Pickens Stadium. The following are the top crowds in the history of Boone Pickens Stadium.

Top 10 Single Game Attendance

Rank	Attendance	Date	Opponent	Score	Source
1	60,218	Nov. 23, 2013	#3 Baylor	W, 49–17	
2	59,638	Oct. 19, 2013	TCU	W, 24–10	
3	59,486	Oct. 24, 2015	Kansas	W, 58–10	
4	59,124	Oct. 25, 2014	#22 West Virginia	L, 10–34	
5 (tied)	59,061	Nov. 7, 2015	#5 TCU	W, 49–29	
5 (tied)	59,061	Sep. 14, 2013	Lamar	W, 59–3	
7	58,895	Nov. 5, 2011	#17 Kansas State	W, 52–45	
8	58,841	Oct. 5, 2013	Kansas State	W, 33–29	
9	58,669	Nov. 22, 2015	#10 Baylor	L, 35–45	
10	58,520	Dec. 7, 2013	#18 Oklahoma	L, 24–33	

== Other major events ==
In April 2025, the four-night “Boys from Oklahoma” event drew more than 200,000 concertgoers to the stadium. Performers included Cross Canadian Ragweed, Turnpike Troubadours, Jason Boland and the Stragglers, The Great Divide, and Stoney LaRue; Stillwater and Oklahoma State are seen as the spiritual home of the "red dirt" country music scene, and all the performers were either Oklahoma natives or got their start playing at venues near the campus.

== See also ==
- List of NCAA Division I FBS football stadiums
- List of American football stadiums by capacity
- Lists of stadiums
