= Happiness and All the Other Things =

Studio album by Cross Canadian Ragweed
- Released: August 31, 2009
- Recorded: March 2009
- Genre: Rock; Southern Rock; Country rock Alternative Country; Red Dirt; Texas Country
- Label: Universal South
- Producer: Mike McClure

Cross Canadian Ragweed chronology
Mission California (2007)	Happiness and All the Other Things (2009)

Professional ratings
Review scores
Source	Rating
Allmusic	4/5 stars

Happiness and All the Other Things is Cross Canadian Ragweed's fifth and final studio album. It was released on August 31, 2009. The album includes twelve new studio tracks and three live tracks, including a cover of Willie Nelson's "Angel Flying Too Close To The Ground", "Soul Agent" from the band's 2007 album Mission California, and a cover of John Hiatt's "Train To Birmingham."

Happiness and All the Other Things is released in commemoration of the band's 15th Anniversary. It is also officially dedicated to the late Randall "Poodie" Locke (Willie Nelson's long-time stage manager). The album cover has a page dedicating the album to him with the words:

"This album is dedicated to the most selfless, giving person that we've ever known. Thanks for believing in us and spreading our name. In loving memory... Poodie Locke, October 3, 1948 - May 6th, 2009... 'There are no bad days'"

The album's first single, '"Kick in the Head," was released August 11, 2009 and debuted at #15 on the Texas Music Chart. '"To Find My Love," was released December 14, 2009 and debuted at #42 on the same chart.

== Track listing ==
1. "51 Pieces" (Cody Canada, Micky Braun, Mike McClure) - 3:42
2. "Bluebonnets" (Canada) - 3:07
3. "Burn Like The Sun" (Canada, McClure, Stephanie Briggs) - 4:22
4. "To Find My Love" (Stephen Bruton) - 4:40
5. "Drag" (Canada, Brandon Jenkins) - 4:47
6. "Kick In The Head" (Canada, Jeremy Plato) - 3:22
7. "Overtable" (Canada, McClure, Briggs) - 3:31
8. "Overtable Interlude" (Canada, McClure) - 1:50
9. "Pretty Lady" (Canada) - 3:42
10. "Tomorrow" (Canada, Briggs) - 3:25
11. "Confident" (Canada, Briggs) - 4:12
12. "My Chances" (Canada) - 4:18
13. "Carmelita" (Warren Zevon) - 3:28
14. "Poo(p)-Eye" 0:05
15. "Angel Flying Too Close To The Ground (live)" (Willie Nelson) - :
16. "Soul Agent (live)" (Scott Evans) - :
17. "Train To Birmingham (live)" (John Hiatt) - :
18. "Confident" (Live in Birmingham, AL) (Bonus Video Track Download)

== Chart performance ==
Chart (2009)	Peak position
U.S. Billboard Top Country Albums	10
U.S. Billboard 200	33
