= Cross Canadian Ragweed (album) =

Studio album by Cross Canadian Ragweed
- Released: September 10, 2002
- Length: 58:33
- Label: Universal South
- Producers: Mike McClure, Cross Canadian Ragweed

Cross Canadian Ragweed chronology
Live and Loud at Billy Bob's Texas (2002)	Cross Canadian Ragweed (2002)	Soul Gravy (2004)

Singles from Cross Canadian Ragweed
- 1. "17" Released: October 2002; 2. "Don't Need You" Released: February 3, 2003; 3. "Anywhere But Here" Released: June 23, 2003; 4. "Constantly" Released: October 2003

Professional ratings
Review scores
Source	Rating
AllMusic	3/5 stars

Cross Canadian Ragweed is the debut studio album for the country rock band Cross Canadian Ragweed. It includes the singles "17" and "Constantly." The Alternate name for the album is "The Purple Album". The color was chosen in honor of Mandy Ragsdale, the younger sister of the band's drummer, Randy Ragsdale. Mandy died in a car accident near College Station, Texas and the album was dedicated to her. It was also the band's first album on the Universal South record label.

William Ruhlmann of AllMusic said, "what impresses most is the overall sound of a band who has forged a distinctive style within a conventional genre through years of playing."

== Track listing ==
All songs written by Cody Canada except where noted.

1. "Anywhere but Here" (Canada, Jeremy Plato) – 4:42
2. "17" – 5:19
3. "Brooklyn Kid" – 3:22
4. "Don't Need You" – 4:43
5. "Walls of Huntsville" – 3:40
6. "Broken" (Mike McClure, Canada) – 5:44
7. "Constantly" – 4:17
8. "Suicide Blues" – 4:36
9. "Other Side" – 4:52
10. "On a Cloud" – 4:18
11. "Carry You Home" – 4:34
12. "Freedom" (McClure, Canada) – 8:19

== Personnel ==
=== Cross Canadian Ragweed ===
- Cody Canada – lead vocals, lead guitar, harmonica, baritone guitar
- Grady Cross – rhythm guitar
- Jeremy Plato – bass guitar, background vocals
- Randy Ragsdale – drums, percussion, piano

=== Additional musicians ===
- Doug Moreland – fiddle on "On a Cloud"
- Mike McClure – piano on "Freedom," acoustic guitar on "Carry You Home" and "17," electric rhythm guitar on "Walls of Huntsville"
- Walt Bowers – Hammond B-3 organ on "Freedom"

== Chart performance ==
Chart (2003)	Peak position
U.S. Billboard Top Country Albums	70
U.S. Billboard Top Heatseekers	43
