= Tecumseh, Oklahoma =

- City
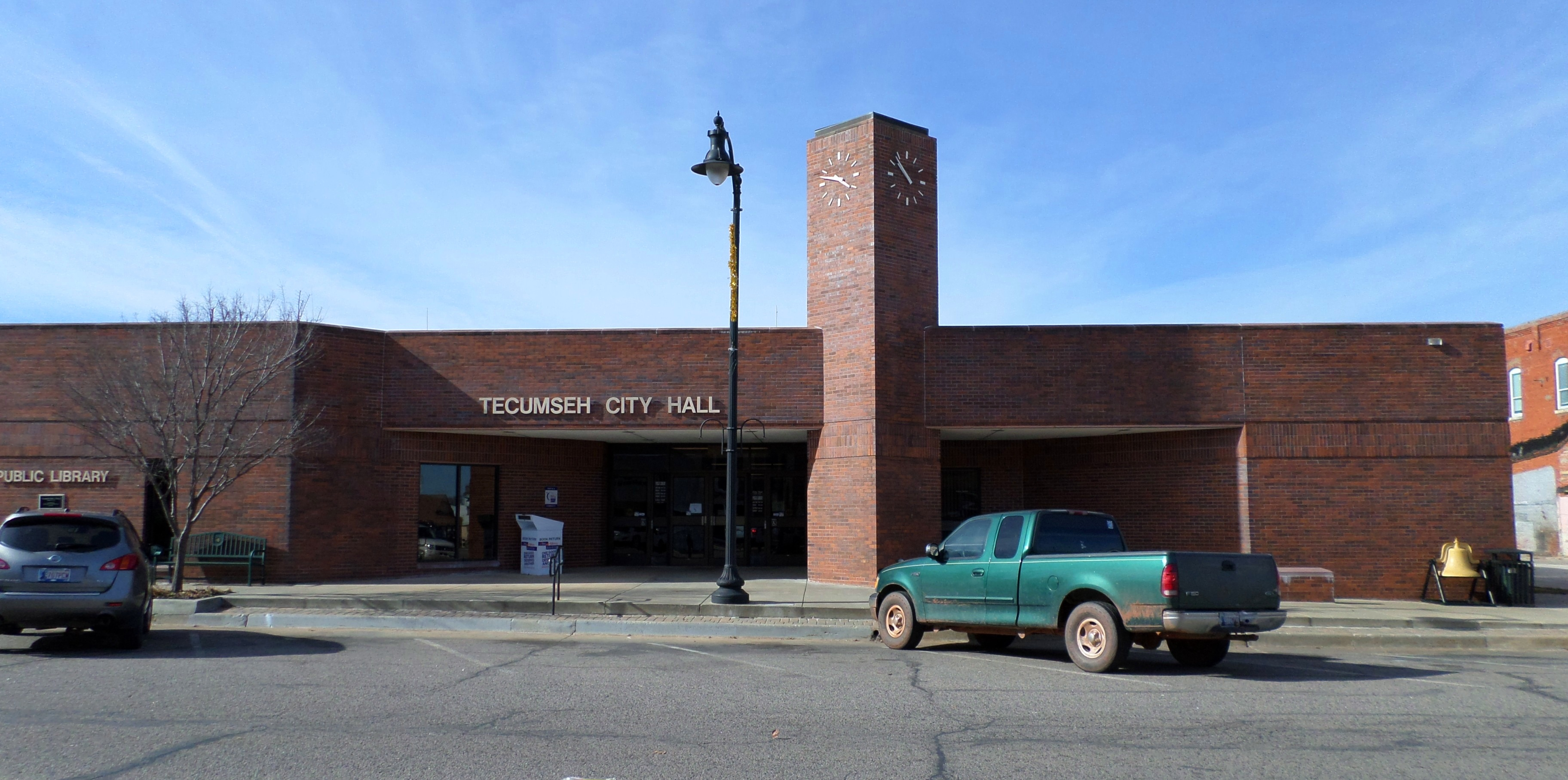
- Tecumseh City Hall

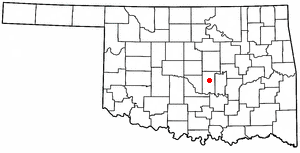
- Location of Tecumseh, Oklahoma
- Coordinates: 35°15′44″N 96°56′01″W
- Country: United States
- State: Oklahoma
- County: Pottawatomie
- Established: 1891

Government
  - Type: Council-Manager
  - City Council: Eddy Parker, Mayor; Linda Farris, Ward 1 Sharon Stewart, Ward 2 Linda Praytor, Ward 3 John Collier, Ward 4

Area
  - Total: 15.25 sq mi (39.50 km^{2})
  - Land: 15.02 sq mi (38.90 km^{2})
  - Water: 0.23 sq mi (0.60 km^{2})
- Elevation: 1,037 ft (316 m)

Population (2020)
  - Total: 6,302
  - Density: 419.6/sq mi (162.01/km^{2})
- Time zone: UTC-6 (Central (CST))
  - Summer (DST): UTC-5 (CDT)
- ZIP code: 74873
- Area codes: 405/572
- FIPS code: 40-72650
- GNIS feature ID: 2412040
- Website: City website

Tecumseh (Meskwaki: Takamithîheki) is a city in Pottawatomie County, Oklahoma. The population was 6,302 by the 2020 United States census. It was named for the noted Shawnee chief, Tecumseh. The locale was designated as the county seat at Oklahoma's statehood, but a county-wide election moved the seat to Shawnee in 1930.

== History ==
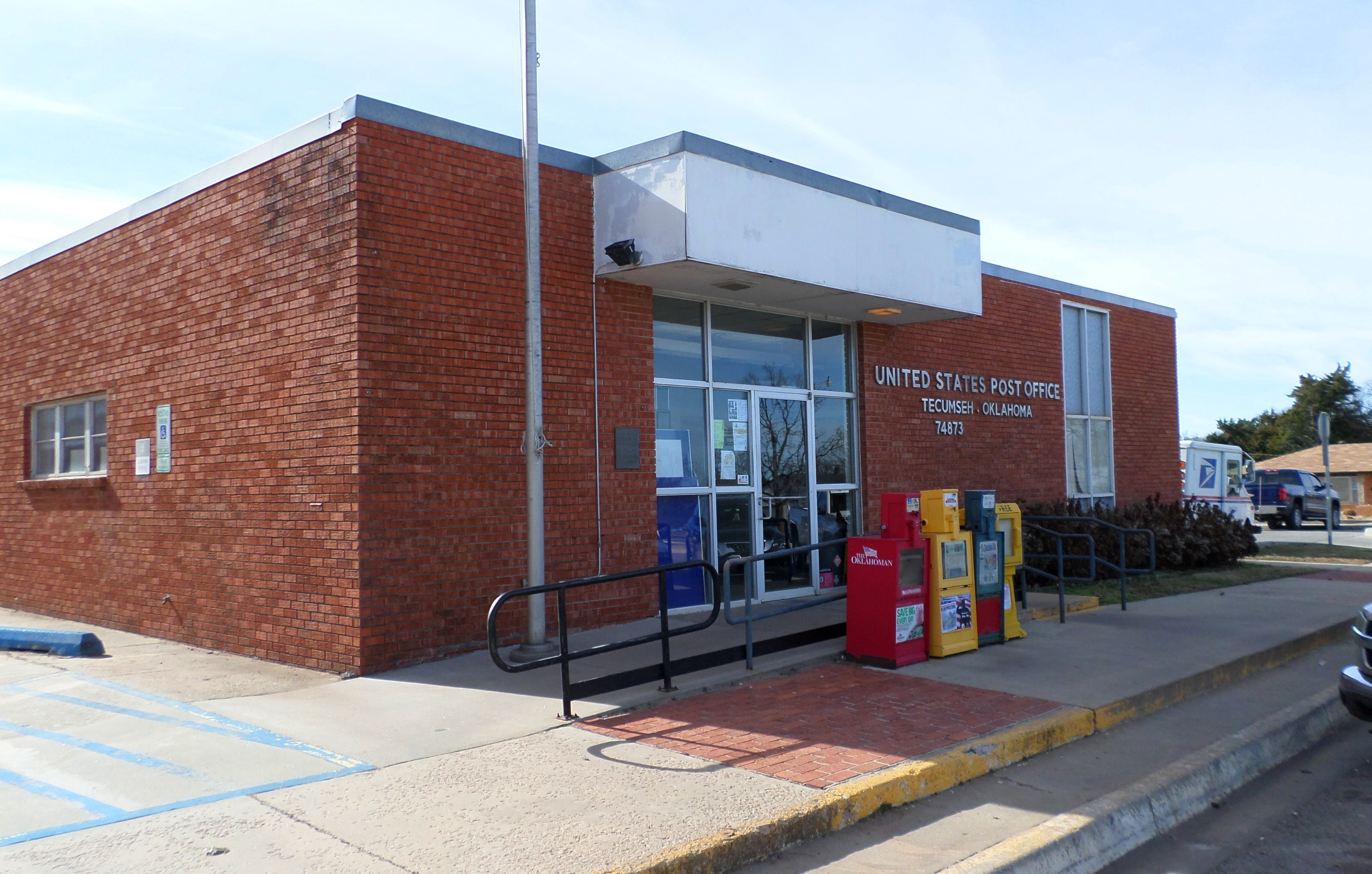
Post office in Tecumseh, Oklahoma

A 320-acre (130-hectare) site was opened for settlement September 23, 1891, as a result of the land run into reservations of the Sac and Fox, Kiowa, Kickapoo, Shawnee, and Pottawatomi peoples. The townsite, named Tecumseh by a U.S. Army major, had been designated as the seat of County "B" in the newly formed Oklahoma Territory by the Department of the Interior on July 17, 1891. (Note: Tecumseh remained as the seat of Pottawatomie County until it was replaced by Shawnee after an election in 1930.) A post office was established in the town on September 18, 1891.

Railroads first arrived in 1896, when the Tecumseh Railway built a line in from Shawnee. This trackage, acquired by the Choctaw, Oklahoma and Gulf Railroad, was extended to Asher in 1902, and was later owned by the Rock Island. In 1903, the Atchison, Topeka and Santa Fe Railway began serving Tecumseh's surrounding agricultural region, in which cotton was the main crop. Tecumseh was linked to Shawnee, Oklahoma by the Shawnee-Tecumseh Traction Co. in 1906, but ending in 1927.

Cotton production dropped in the 1920s because of depressed prices and a boll weevil infestation. The population declined for a time after 1930, because many townspeople moved away to earn a living elsewhere.

In 2002, the Supreme Court of the United States evaluated whether requiring students from Tecumseh schools to take drug tests to participate in extracurricular activities was constitutional. In a 5–4 decision, the court ruled that the tests were allowable in Board of Education v. Earls.

=== 2010 tornado ===
On Monday May 10, 2010, the city was struck by an EF3 tornado. The city's southeast side sustained the most damage, and several homes along East Highland Street were severely damaged or destroyed. Three churches were also damaged. The tornado was the first to strike the town since the May 17, 1981, tornado that hit the rural southern part of the town and was the first tornado to go through the city proper since records have been kept in 1950.

== Geography ==
According to the United States Census Bureau, the city has a total area of 15.3 square miles (40 km^{2}), of which 0.2 square miles (0.52 km^{2}) (1.57%) is covered by water.

== Demographics ==
Historical population
Census	Pop.	Note	%±
1900	1,193		—
1910	1,626		36.3%
1920	1,429		−12.1%
1930	2,419		69.3%
1940	2,042		−15.6%
1950	2,275		11.4%
1960	2,630		15.6%
1970	4,451		69.2%
1980	5,123		15.1%
1990	5,750		12.2%
2000	6,098		6.1%
2010	6,457		5.9%
2020	6,302		−2.4%
U.S. Decennial Census

=== 2020 census ===
As of the 2020 census, Tecumseh had a population of 6,302. The median age was 36.5 years. 27.0% of residents were under the age of 18 and 16.6% of residents were 65 years of age or older. For every 100 females there were 91.7 males, and for every 100 females age 18 and over there were 86.8 males age 18 and over.

62.0% of residents lived in urban areas, while 38.0% lived in rural areas.

There were 2,395 households in Tecumseh, of which 35.7% had children under the age of 18 living in them. Of all households, 40.8% were married-couple households, 18.9% were households with a male householder and no spouse or partner present, and 32.2% were households with a female householder and no spouse or partner present. About 29.3% of all households were made up of individuals and 14.5% had someone living alone who was 65 years of age or older.

There were 2,702 housing units, of which 11.4% were vacant. Among occupied housing units, 58.1% were owner-occupied and 41.9% were renter-occupied. The homeowner vacancy rate was 2.0% and the rental vacancy rate was 11.4%.

Racial composition as of the 2020 census
Race	Percent
White	66.7%
Black or African American	3.0%
American Indian and Alaska Native	14.9%
Asian	0.5%
Native Hawaiian and Other Pacific Islander	0.1%
Some other race	0.6%
Two or more races	14.2%
Hispanic or Latino (of any race)	4.2%

=== 2000 census ===
As of the 2000 census, 6,098 people, 2,344 households, and 1,654 families were residing in the city. The population density was 405.5 inhabitants per square mile (156.6/km^{2}). The 2,565 housing units had an average density of 170.6 units per square mile (65.9 units/km^{2}). The racial makeup of the city was 78.98% White, 2.05% African American, 12.87% Native American, 0.18% Asian, 0.48% from other races, and 5.44% from two or more races. Hispanics or Latinos of any race were 1.77% of the population.

Of the 2,344 households, 34.0% had children under 18 living with them, 54.1% were married couples living together, 12.7% had a female householder with no husband present, and 29.4% were not families. About 26.3% of all households were made up of individuals, and 13.9% had someone living alone who was 65 or older. The average household size was 2.52, and the average family size was 3.04.

In the city, the age distribution was 28.4% under 18, 8.6% from 18 to 24, 25.8% from 25 to 44, 20.6% from 45 to 64, and 16.7% who were 65 or older. The median age was 35 years. For every 100 females, there were 90.5 males. For every 100 females 18 and over, there were 83.9 males.

The median income for a household in the city was $27,202, and for a family was $32,235. Males had a median income of $26,250 versus $20,820 for females. The per capita income for the city was $14,300. About 15.0% of families and 16.6% of the population were below the poverty line, including 20.3% of those under age 18 and 14.8% of those age 65 or over.

== Government ==
The city of Tecumseh has a home-rule charter form of government.

The Central Oklahoma Juvenile Center, located in Tecumseh, is an Oklahoma Office of Juvenile Affairs correctional facility that holds both boys and girls. is located on a 147.7-acre (59.8 ha) plat of land and occupies 30-acre (12 ha) of it. The school opened in 1917 and was under the Oklahoma Office of Juvenile Affairs since 1995; previously, it was in the Oklahoma Department of Human Services. It previously served as an orphanage and mental-health center in addition to being a juvenile correctional facility. Known by its current name since 1992, it was previously known as Girls Town, the Oklahoma State Industrial School for Incorrigible Girls, the State Industrial School for White Girls, Russell Industrial School, and Central Oklahoma Juvenile Treatment Center.

== Education ==
The majority of Tecumseh is in the Tecumseh Public Schools school district.. Some pieces are in Shawnee Public Schools, Bethel Public Schools, and South Rock Creek Public School (elementary).

== Notable people ==
- Terry Allen, big band vocalist
- Mary Fallin, 27th governor of Oklahoma and 14th lieutenant governor of Oklahoma
- Mike McClure, musician and founding member of The Great Divide
- Ruben Rivers, United States Army officer and Medal of Honor recipient
- [Jason Murray]
