= No Justice (disambiguation) =

No Justice is a country band in the United States.

No Justice may also refer to:

- "No Justice", a song on the 2016 mixtape Campaign by Ty Dolla Sign
- "No justice, no peace", a political slogan
- "No Justice, No Pants," a 2007 episode of the American sitcom Just Jordan
- No Justice, a comic book miniseries involving the Justice League

== See also ==
- No Peace Without Justice, an Italian nonprofit organization
