= Highspeed Hayride =

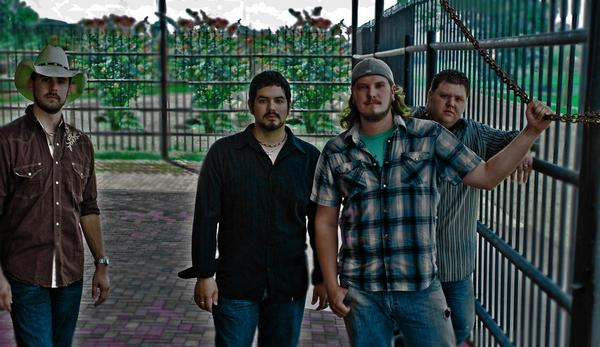
- Gene Moreno, David Stockton, Matt Groll and Bo Carter are Highspeed Hayride (2008).

Background information
- Origin: Goliad, Texas, United States
- Genres: Country
- Years active: 2002–present
- Label: Red Shack Records
- Website: www.highspeedhayride.com

Highspeed Hayride is an American country music band established in 2002 in Goliad, Texas. The band consists of Eugene Moreno III on lead vocals and rhythm guitars, Shelby David Stockton, Jr. on bass guitar and harmony vocals, Matthew Groll on drums and Bo Carter on lead guitar and harmony vocals. Highspeed Hayride has released three independent albums including Lights of Town (2004), Thought You Should Know (2006), and the self-titled album Highspeed Hayride (2008). Highspeed Hayride has shared the stage with artists including The Bellamy Brothers, Little Texas, John Conlee, Earl Thomas Conley, David Allan Coe, Robert Earl Keen, Shooter Jennings, George Strait, Kevin Fowler, Pat Green, and Randy Rogers. Highspeed Hayride played a farewell show in May 2010.

== Career ==
In 2006, Thought You Should Know (produced by Mike McClure, formerly of The Great Divide) spawned two Texas Music Chart singles. The first, a revamped version of the Eddie Rabbitt song "Drivin' My Life Away" scored top 40 chart position peaking at No. 34. The second single, "Get Out of My Way" (EM3, BMI), penned by lead singer Gene Moreno reached No. 30 on the Texas Music Chart.

In 2008, Highspeed Hayride went to Austin, Texas' Bismeaux Studio, owned by Ray Benson of Asleep at the Wheel, to record their third independent album, the self-titled Highspeed Hayride. The group enlisted friend and fellow musician Billy Jo High to produce and play lead guitar on the album. The first single, "Boots" peaked at the No. 19 spot on the Texas Music Chart. In April 2009, Highspeed Hayride won the Album of the Year award, and High won Producer of the Year, at the Texas Music Awards.

In May 2010, Highspeed Hayride appeared as presenters at the Texas Music Awards show.

== Discography ==
=== Albums ===
Year	Title	Label
2004	Lights of Town	Red Shack Records
2006	Thought You Should Know	Red Shack Records
2008	Highspeed Hayride	Red Shack Records
