= Cody Canada and The Departed =

American rock band

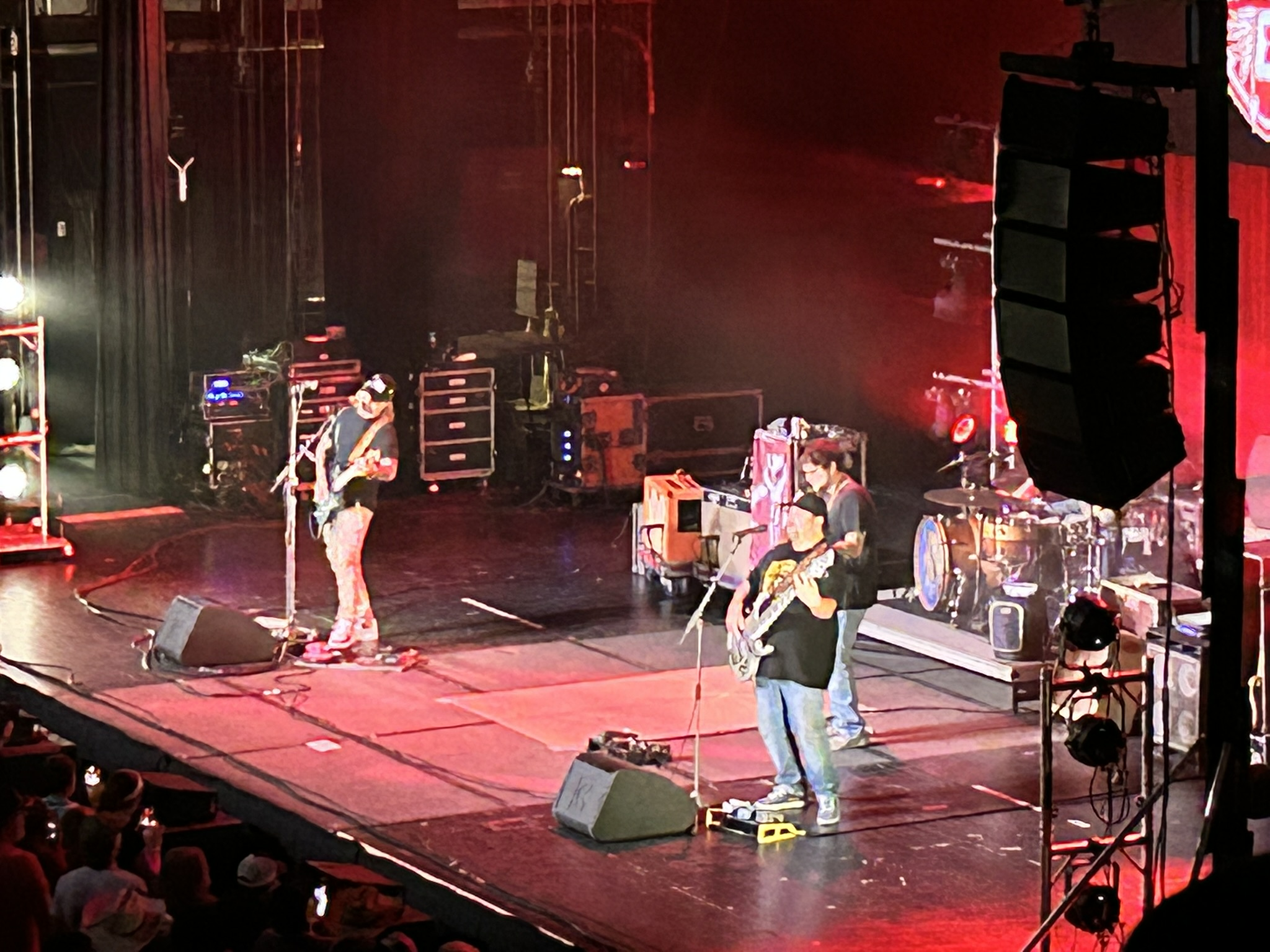
- Cody Canada and The Departed performing in Muskogee, Oklahoma on June 6, 2025.

Background information
- Also known as: The Departed (2011–2013) Jeremy Plato and the Departed (2016)
- Origin: Yukon, Oklahoma, USA
- Genres: Alternative Rock, Alternative Country, Red Dirt
- Years active: 2011–present
- Label: Underground Sound
- Spinoff of: Cross Canadian Ragweed
- Members: Cody Canada; Jeremy Plato; Eric Hansen; Peyton Glasco
- Past members: Dave Bowen; Seth James; Steve Littleton; Chris Doege; Ross Smith
- Website: thedepartedmusic.com

Cody Canada and The Departed (also known as The Departed and Jeremy Plato and The Departed) is an American rock band. The band was formed in 2011 by Cody Canada, the former lead vocalist and guitarist for Cross Canadian Ragweed after that band broke up in 2010. The band currently consists of Canada (guitars and lead vocals), Jeremy Plato (bass guitar and vocals), Peyton Glasco (guitar and vocals), and Eric Hansen (drums).

== History ==
=== 2010-2012: Formation and This Is Indian Land ===
After Oklahoma based southern rock band Cross Canadian Ragweed broke up in 2010, Cody Canada decided to start the Departed that was billed by Texas and Oklahoma music scene observers as a "Super Group." Canada remained on lead vocals and lead guitar and former Ragweed bass guitar player Jeremy Plato joined Canada. Canada recruited friend and Texas based blues rock singer and songwriter Seth James to be co-lead on guitar and vocals, well known red dirt keyboardist Steve Littleton, and fellow Yukon, Oklahoma native Dave Bowen on drums. Naming themselves "The Departed" as all had left previous bands to join together, the group at first billed themselves as "Cody Canada and The Departed" namely for fan recognition according to the band members in a 2011 interview.

The band released its first album in June 2011 titled This Is Indian Land through its own record label, Underground Sound. The record was a tribute album to Oklahoma music and songwriters. The band's cover version of the Red Dirt Rangers song "Staring Down the Sun" was the only released single from the album. Two other songs, "The Ballad of Rosalie" and "Skyline Radio" both charted on the Texas and Oklahoma music charts.

=== 2012-2015: Adventūs ===
On August 24, 2012, now billed as simply The Departed, the band announced on its website and in social media that it would release its first original album, Adventūs (Latin for "arrival") on November 13, 2012, on Underground Sound. Bowen had left the group and was replaced by Chris Doege on the drums. The band moved to an alternative rock and grunge sound with driving electric guitars and the power vocals of James and Canada. Three singles were released: "Worth The Fight", "Prayer For the Lonely" and "Flagpole".

=== 2015-2018: HippieLovePunk & Line-Up Changes ===
In September 2013, Seth James announced that he intended to leave the band. The parting was amicable; as James said. "After three years of great times and great music, I have decided to take a step down as a band member of the Departed. It has been an unbelievable ride and I am so grateful for the support and love along the way. My last show will be November 23 at Gruene Hall. I look forward to supporting these guys alongside you as they continue down the road." The band continued performing as a four-piece group.

In 2014, the band finished a new album, HippieLovePunk. It was released on January 13, 2015, and debuted at No. 9 on the Top Alternative Country Albums chart, with 4,700 copies sold in the US in its first week. The sound was, for the most part, still like the alt-rock sound of Adventūs. Cody Canada and The Departed, as the band was once again known, debuted a new line-up at The MusicFest in Steamboat Springs, Colorado, on January 8, 2015. East Texas native Ross Smith replaced Littleton on keyboards and took up rhythm guitars, while Eric Hansen became the drummer in place of Doege. In late November 2015, the band produced a music video for the song "All Nighter" on HippieLovePunk at John T. Floore's Country Store in Helotes, Texas. The song and the video were dedicated to the former bass guitar player for Micky and the Motorcars Mark McCoy, who had died in Idaho in 2012 while on vacation. The songs "Inbetweener" and "Easy" were released as singles.

In early 2016, the band announced on social media that it would be releasing an album consisting of cover versions of classic country songs. This project was named Jeremy Plato And The Departed: In Retrospect, honoring 1960s era country music with songs by Johnny Paycheck, Stonewall Jackson and Charlie Walker, among others. The bass guitarist, Plato, took the lead vocals and had Canada, Smith and Hansen as his backing on the project. Reckless Kelly's Cody Braun and Cody Angel of Jason Boland and the Stragglers contributed their instrumentation to the project, as well as the folk singer Jamie Lin Wilson, who sang backing vocals and also appeared on a popular duet with Plato.

=== 2018-present: 3, singles, and Cross Canadian Ragweed Reunion ===
In early 2017, Ross Smith left the band and The Departed became a 3-piece set with Canada, Plato, and Hansen. On April 20, 2018 the band released the single "Lipstick" from their new album 3, that was released on June 29, 2018, by the Underground Sound Label. Mike McClure, who had produced several of Cross Canadian Ragweed's albums, came back to produce the album. The name of the album comes from the number of those who were left in the band. It was also their 3rd album of original content as In Retrospect, and Indian Land had both been cover albums.

Due to the band's current lineup, several popular Cross Canadian Ragweed songs have made their way back into the Departed's nightly set list in addition to the new material the band has written. Canada said in a 2018 Rolling Stone interview that he was "truly happy with the way the band is now and I feel this is the band I have always wanted, and really deserved."

Canada and Plato reunited with the other members of Cross Canadian Ragweed in 2024, but plan to continue touring with The Departed.

== Band members ==
Current

- Cody Canada – lead and occasional backing vocals, lead and rhythm guitar, harmonica (2011–present)
- Jeremy Plato – bass, backing and occasional lead vocals (2011–present)
- Eric Hansen – drums, percussion (2015–present)
- Peyton Glasco – rhythm and lead guitar (2024–present; touring member 2021–2024)

Former

- Seth James – lead and occasional backing vocals, lead and rhythm guitar (2011–2013)
- Dave Bowen – drums, percussion (2011–2012)
- Steve Littleton – keyboards, backing vocals (2011–2015)
- Chris Doege – drums, percussion (2012–2015)
- Ross Smith – keyboards, rhythm guitar, backing vocals (2015–2018)

Timeline

== Discography ==
Studio albums

- This Is Indian Land (2011)
- Adventūs (2012)
- HippieLovePunk (2015)
- In Retrospect (2016)
- 3 (2018)
- Soul Gravy 2022 (2022)

Music videos

Year	Video	Director
2011	"Staring Down the Sun"	Tony Gates
2012	"Worth the Fight"	Tony Gates
2013	"Prayer for the Lonely"	Tony Gates
2015	"Inbetweener"	Tony Gates
2016	"All Nighter"	Tony Gates
