= Cross Canadian Ragweed =

American country and rock band

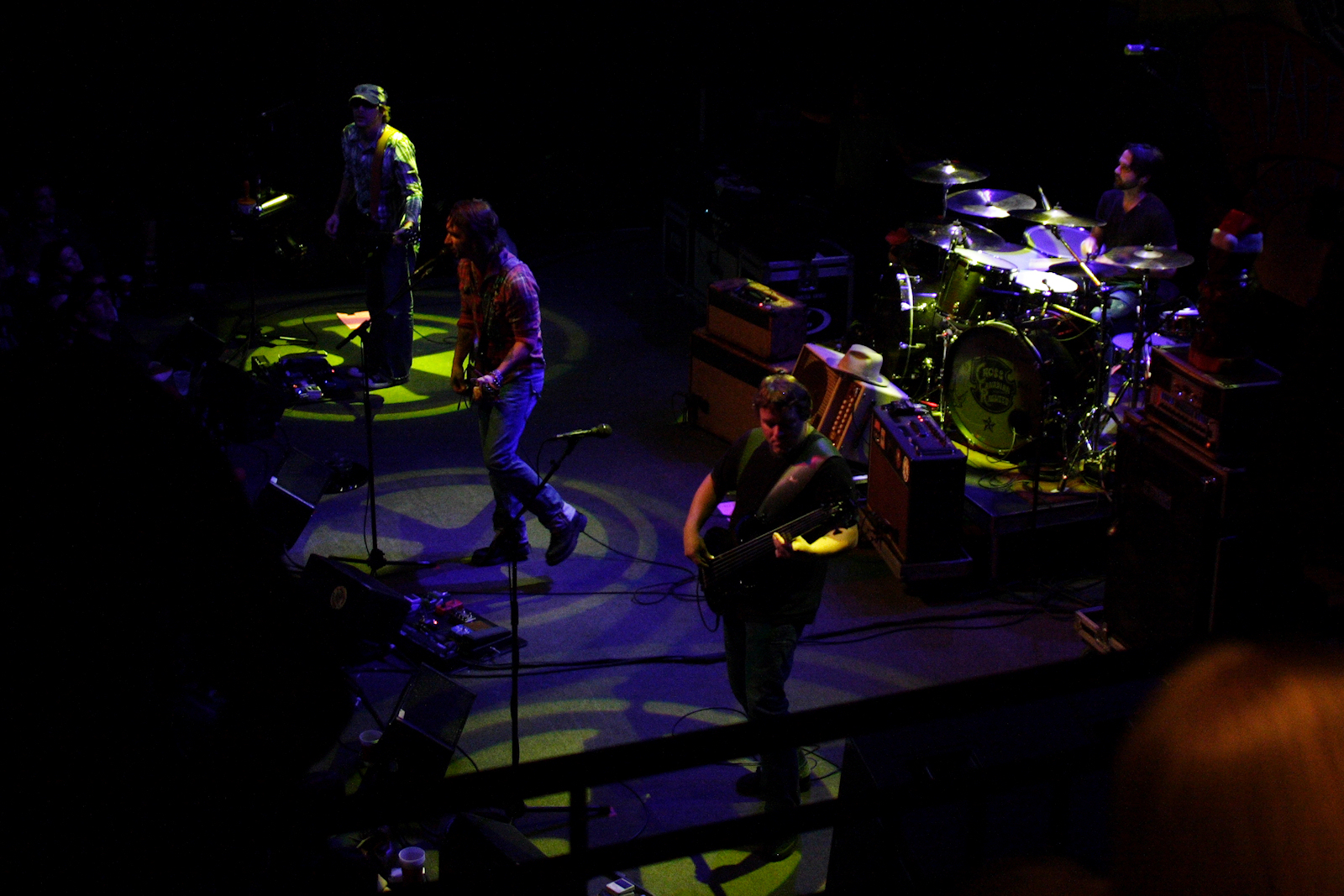
- Cross Canadian Ragweed in 2009

Background information
- Origin: Yukon, Oklahoma, US
- Genres: Alternative country; alternative rock; Americana; country rock; grunge; Southern rock; red dirt
- Years active: 1994–2010; 2025–present
- Labels: Smith Music Group, Universal South
- Spinoffs: Cody Canada and The Departed
- Members: Cody Canada; Grady Cross; Randy Ragsdale; Jeremy Plato
- Past members: Matt Wiedemann

Cross Canadian Ragweed is an American alt-country and rock band formed in Yukon, Oklahoma in 1994 that played until 2010, and then reunited in 2025. The band takes its name from the last names of the original 4 members. Cross- Grady Cross, Canadian- Cody Canada, Rag- Randy Ragsdale, Weed- Matt Wiedemann. The band consists of Cody Canada (lead guitar/vocals), Grady Cross (guitar), Randy Ragsdale (drums), and Jeremy Plato (bass guitar). The group released five studio albums and three live albums from 1994 until 2010. The band was at the forefront of the rise of the red dirt music scene in Oklahoma and the Texas Music scene.

== History ==
=== Formation ===
Cross Canadian Ragweed started when Randy Ragsdale met Cody Canada, Matt Weidemann, and Grady Cross, who had also been playing together as teenagers growing up in Yukon, Oklahoma. The four had known each other since grade school and started playing together in Ragsdale's home seven nights a week under the tutelage of Ragsdale's father, Johnny, who had worked with musical artists in the area. The band officially formed by combining a part of every band member's last name, coming up with the name Cross Canadian Ragweed. Matt Weidemann left the band in 1998, and Jeremy Plato joined, playing the bass guitar. After finishing high school, the band moved to the College Town of Stillwater, Oklahoma, home of Oklahoma State University, where acts like Mike McClure's The Great Divide and singer-songwriter Jimmy LaFave had established enough of a local scene to earn Stillwater the nickname North Austin. It was during this time that they were exposed to the rock/country/folk sounds of red dirt music.

== Early years ==
=== Carney and Live And Loud at the Wormy Dog Saloon ===
The group had already received significant college radio airplay before it released its first album, Carney in 1998 on their own independent label. Initially, selling the band in the market it was based in was considered by music observers to be far-fetched; however, the fan base's passion and loyalty to the band allowed them to find success in releasing that first album. Carney was well received, then the band released Live and Loud at the Wormy Dog Saloon in 1999, which was also well received, especially in the local scene. Ragweed released its second studio album "Highway 377" in 2001, though it was recorded in 1999. The album cover and title, as well as the track "Highway 377" were all based on a car accident near Wolf, Oklahoma in 1999 when Canada lost control of the truck he was driving and went 60 feet below into a creek underneath a US Highway 377 bridge, though injured somewhat severely Canada made a full recovery and has often spoken about how it was a defining moment for him. The album also propelled them into wider audience and into Texas (Canada's state of birth) and also where the band had been touring heavily in their early years. Though not a released single, the song "Long Way Home" was featured on several Dodge Truck Commercials in both Texas and Oklahoma. The band cut their first edition of the song "Alabama" which was the most popular track on the album and paid tribute to drummer Randy Ragsdale's father Johnny, who died of cancer in 1997 with the closing tracks "Johnny's Song" and "Daddy's at Home." In 2002 the band recorded their second live album Live and Loud at Billy Bob's Texas in Fort Worth, Texas. The songs were mainly live versions of songs off Carney and Highway 377, with a handful of cover songs.

== Universal South Records and Nationwide Popularity ==
=== Cross Canadian Ragweed (Purple Album) ===
In 2002, the group then signed with Universal South Records and released a self-titled album also alternately known as 'The Purple Album'. It was a tribute to the band's "little sister" Mandi Ragsdale, the younger sister of the band's drummer Randy Ragsdale, who had died in an auto accident near College Station, Texas, and whose favorite color was purple. The album produced charted singles "17" and the ballad "Constantly", and released a music video for the hard rock track "Don't Need You."

=== Soul Gravy ===
Ragweed's 2004 album, Soul Gravy, debuted at No. 4 on the Billboard charts. Lee Ann Womack provided background vocals on the popular single "Sick and Tired". The project also saw the re-release of the song "Alabama" (off of 2001's Highway 377) that blended sounds of southern rock, arena rock, and grunge and became very popular. "Alabama" appeared on the Billboard Charts as well.

=== Garage ===
In October 2005 the band released Garage, described by both the band and raters at AllMusic as the group's "grungiest album ever." The sound featured the traditional red dirt sound, but had a heavy sound of rock, grunge, and garage rock. Two songs, "Fighting' For" and "This Time Around" both became hits off the album. The project charted higher than any studio album the band ever released and for the first time, the band found its way into rock radio airplay across the United States due to the song "Dimebag", a tribute to former Damageplan and Pantera guitarist "Dimebag" Darrell Abbott, who had been killed months earlier during a concert.

=== Back To Tulsa: Live And Loud At Cain's Ballroom ===
In late 2006, Ragweed released their third and final live album, Live and Loud At Cain's Ballroom in Tulsa, Oklahoma. The band's 24 song project was well received and featured songs from their previous projects The Purple Album, Soul Gravy, and Garage. It also featured a handful of covers as well such as Neil Young's The Needle and the Damage Done and Robert Earl Keen's "Lonely Feeling."

=== Mission California ===
Cross Canadian Ragweed recorded Mission California, their fourth studio album, at the end of March 2007. The namesake of the album was due to the recording taking place in San Diego, California. The band spent 25 days in the studio; the first 5 cutting 15 tracks, the next 20 polishing each. Lee Ann Womack once again laid down background vocals on 4 of the tracks to include the Chris Knight cover "Cry Lonely." Mission California was released on October 2, 2007. AllMusic reviewed the Album and found that the project was "name appropriately, the band sounds much more a progressive and radio friendly sound that combines "southern rock, americana, and the sounds that would come from a place like California."

=== Happiness and All the Other Things ===
The band's tenth and final album, Happiness and All the Other Things was released on August 31, 2009, commemorating the band's 15th Anniversary. It featured 12 new studio tracks and three live tracks. Recorded in California, this album includes a track entitled "51 Pieces", which Canada penned with Micky Braun. The song was based on an incident where Ohio State police ransacked the band's bus after a stop in Cleveland at the House of Blues. It also featured "Blue Bonnets" which is dedicated to Cody's oldest son Dierks. Happiness and All the Other Things was officially dedicated to the late Randall Locke (Willie Nelson's long-time stage manager) who suddenly died on May 6, 2009. Other popular tracks were "To Find My Love", "Burn Like The Sun", and "Kick In The Head."

=== Hiatus and band break-up ===
In May 2010, Cross Canadian Ragweed announced a hiatus from touring. In a band press release, Ragsdale explained, "Right now, I need to be at home for my family, particularly my son JC, who has autism. He's 10 years old now and still struggling in his development. I feel the only way I can help him is to be more hands on and close to home." Despite Ragsdale wanting to "get another drummer and press on," Canada stated "We’ve always said from the start, we’re Ragweed as the four of us, or not Ragweed at all." In September 2010, Canada officially announced the band was calling it quits by announcing their "Last Call Show" in October 2010 at Joe's Bar in Chicago, IL, stating "as far as that's concerned, Oct 24 is the last one, the last gig."

=== Post break-up ===
Since Cross Canadian Ragweed, Canada and Plato formed The Departed with fellow Yukon-native Dave Bowen (drums), Seth James (guitar), and Steve Littleton (keyboards), releasing their debut album "This Is Indian Land" in June 2011. The band would produce 3 albums of original material, all with diverse sounds, and two albums of covers of 1990's red dirt songs and the classic country of the 1960s and 1970s. Ragsdale and Cross both returned to Yukon. Ragsdale played with Stoney LaRue until 2013 and now works in the oil and natural gas industry, while Cross purchased and operates the bar that was the very first venue Cross Canadian Ragweed performed in 1994.

=== Reunion ===
In late 2024, the Facebook page for the band, which had remained untouched for almost 15 years, changed its picture, exciting Ragweed fans, though there was cautious optimism as Canada had said repeatedly through the years since the breakup and as recently as 2023 that Cross Canadian Ragweed would never return. The picture changed again, this time as a picture of the bands symbol wrapped like a Christmas present, then announced that there would indeed be a reunion. The band announced their reunion in September 2024, announcing a show alongside Jason Boland & The Stragglers, Turnpike Troubadours, Stoney LaRue, and The Great Divide. The show was originally scheduled to take place on April 12, 2025, at Boone Pickens Stadium. Due to pre-sale ticket demand a second show was added for April 11, 2025. The band also played its second reunion concert on the campus of Baylor University at McLane Stadium in August 2025, and announced on stage that there would be future show in the coming year. After the two shows sold out on Monday, October 7, 2024, two more shows were added later that day for the Thursday before and the Sunday after. After tickets sold out on Tuesday, October 8, 2024, a grand total of 180,764 tickets were reported sold for the weekend of April 10–13, 2025.

The band played a surprise set at Mile 0 Music Fest in Key West, Florida in January 2025. This was the band's first live performance in over 15 years.

== Influences and sound ==
Ragweed's sound and also many of the other acts they have played with have led to a debate as to whether the band is a country band or a rock band. Canada said in upon the release of Garage in a 2005 interview with Lone Star Music Magazine that the band was "a rock band with some country influence...we grew up around Merle Haggard and Willie Nelson...but we are more on the rock side." The band is influenced heavily by grunge, 1990's alternative rock, along with some selected punk such as Green Day. Canada and Plato also have said in interviews with The Texas Music Scene they both grew up loving heavy metal and still listen to it and "incorporate it when we can." The band also combined the sound of southern rock acts such as The Allman Brothers Band, Marshall Tucker Band, and Lynyrd Skynyrd along with outlaw country. Canada said that rock bands such as Nirvana, Pearl Jam, Stone Temple Pilots, AC/DC, and Soundgarden have all been a part of the influence on the band's sound as well as country music influences such has Haggard, Nelson, Guy Clark, and Robert Earl Keen. Due to their unique sound, the band often had a hard time getting radio airplay on either mainstream rock or country stations.

== Notable appearances ==
The band frequently played with other stars of the Red Dirt and Texas Music scene including Stoney Larue, Jason Boland & The Stragglers, Micky & The Motorcars, Reckless Kelly, (Canada's brother-in-law) Wade Bowen, No Justice, Johnny Cooper, Seth James, and Brandon Rhyder. The band played with country music star Dierks Bentley numerous times. Bentley referenced the band in his song "Free and Easy (Down the Road I Go)", singing that "Ragweed's rockin' on the radio".

Ragweed has toured and/or played with rock and alternative acts Ted Nugent, Lynyrd Skynyrd, Jonny Lang, ZZ Top, Sammy Hagar, The Black Crowes, Old 97's, Son Volt, John Fogerty, and Jonathan Tyler and The Northern Lights.

"Cry Lonely" is a playable track in Rock Band Country Track Pack.

The song "Boys from Oklahoma" plays as the credits roll in the movie Leaves of Grass starring Edward Norton and Susan Sarandon.

"Anywhere But Here" is played during the Season 2 Episode 6 of the NBC television series Grimm.

== Band members ==
Current

- Cody Canada – lead and occasional backing vocals, lead guitar, harmonica (1994–2010, 2024–present)
- Grady Cross – rhythm guitar, backing vocals (1994–2010, 2024–present)
- Randy Ragsdale – drums, percussion (1994–2010, 2024–present)
- Jeremy Plato – bass, backing and occasional lead vocals (1998–2010, 2024–present)

Touring Members- Graycie York- Backing vocals (2025- present)

Former

- Matt Weidemann – bass, backing vocals (1994–1998)

Timeline

== Discography ==
=== Studio albums ===
Title	Album details	Peak chart positions	
Title	Album details	US Country	US
Carney	Release date: 1998; Label: Smith Entertainment; Formats: CD	—	—
Highway 377	Release date: 2001; Label: Underground Sound, Smith Entertainment; Formats: CD, music download	-	-
Cross Canadian Ragweed	Release date: September 10, 2002; Label: Universal South Records; Formats: CD	70	—
Soul Gravy	Release date: March 9, 2004; Label: Universal South Records; Formats: CD, music download	5	51
Garage	Release date: October 4, 2005; Label: Universal South Records; Formats: CD, music download	6	37
Mission California	Release date: October 2, 2007; Label: Universal South Records; Formats: CD, music download	6	30
Happiness and All the Other Things	Release date: August 31, 2009; Label: Universal South Records; Formats: CD, music download	10	33
"—" denotes releases that did not chart

=== Live albums ===
Title	Album details	Peak chart positions		
Title	Album details	US Country	US	US Indie
Live and Loud at the Wormy Dog Saloon	Release date: October 29, 1999; Label: Broken Records; Formats: CD, cassette	—	—	—
Live and Loud at Billy Bob's Texas	Release date: July 9, 2002; Label: Smith Music Group; Formats: CD	—	—	43
Back to Tulsa - Live and Loud at Cain's Ballroom	Release date: October 31, 2006; Label: Universal South Records; Formats: CD, music download	27	120	—
"—" denotes releases that did not chart

=== Singles ===
Year	Single	Peak positions	Album
Year	Single	US Country	Album
2002	"17"	57	Cross Canadian Ragweed
2003	"Don't Need You"	—	Cross Canadian Ragweed
2003	"Anywhere But Here"	—	Cross Canadian Ragweed
2003	"Constantly"	57	Cross Canadian Ragweed
2004	"Sick and Tired"	46	Soul Gravy
2004	"Alabama"	46	Soul Gravy
2005	"Fightin' For"	39	Garage
2006	"This Time Around"	43	Garage
2006	"Late Last Night"	—	Garage
2007	"I Believe You"	—	Mission California
2008	"Cry Lonely"	59	Mission California
2009	"Kick in the Head"	—	Happiness and All the Other Things
2009	"To Find My Love"	—	Happiness and All the Other Things
"—" denotes releases that did not chart

=== Music videos ===
Year	Video	Director
2001	"Look at Me"	Darren Cameron
2002	"Don't Need You"	Roger Pistole
2002	"17"	Roger Pistole
2003	"Constantly"	Roger Pistole
2004	"Sick and Tired" (with Lee Ann Womack)	Eric Welch
2004	"Alabama"	Stephen Shepherd
2005	"Fightin' For"	Trey Fanjoy
2006	"Late Last Night"	Rob Dennis
2008	"I Believe You"	

== Honors and awards ==
=== 2025 Oklahoma Music Hall of Fame Inductions ===
The Oklahoma Music Hall of Fame inducted Stoney LaRue, Jason Boland & The Stragglers, The Great Divide, and Cross Canadian Ragweed during a special ceremony held on Saturday, April 12, 2025, during the Boys from Oklahoma concert series.

The induction took place between performances by the Turnpike Troubadours and Cross Canadian Ragweed, celebrating the legacy and influence of Oklahoma's Red Dirt music scene. All four inductees are regarded as pioneers of the genre, known for shaping the musical identity of the region.
