= Cain's Ballroom =

Historic music venue in Tulsa, Oklahoma

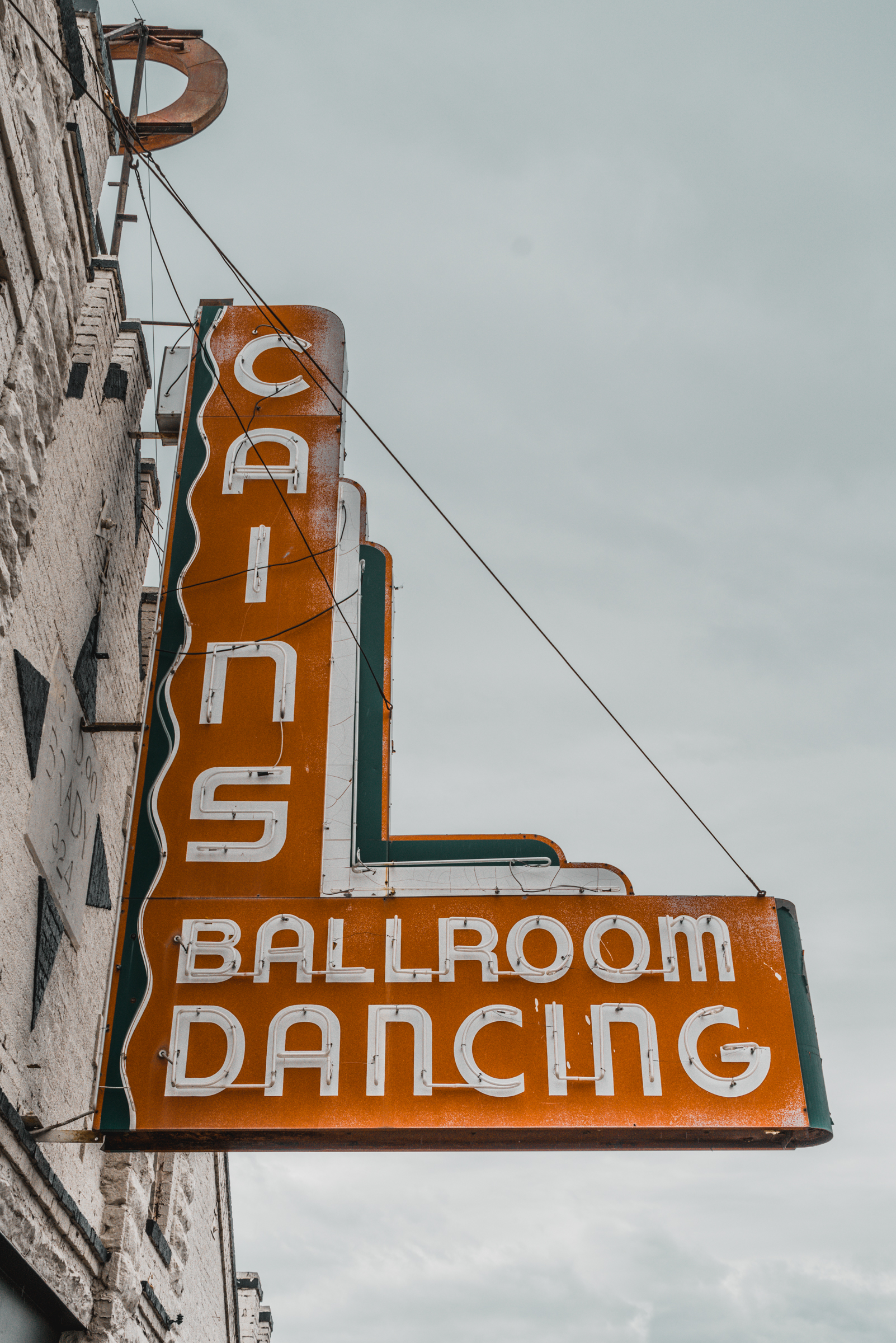
- The historic sign of Cain's Ballroom
- Interactive map of Cain's Ballroom
- Address: 423 North Main Street
- Location: Tulsa, Oklahoma, United States
- Capacity: 1,800

Construction
- Opened: 1924

Website
- cainsballroom.com
- Cain's Dancing Academy
- U.S. National Register of Historic Places
- Coordinates: 36°9′38.46″N 95°59′35.31″W
- Architectural style: Late 19th And Early 20th Century American Movements
- NRHP reference No.: 03000874
- Added to NRHP: September 4, 2003

Cain's Ballroom, often simply called the Cain's, is a music venue in Tulsa, Oklahoma that was built in 1924. The building is a historical landmark in downtown Tulsa, with performances still running today.

== History ==
Cain's Ballroom was originally built in 1924 by W. Tate Brady as his garage. The building was purchased in 1930 by Madison W. “Daddy” Cain to serve as "Cain's Dance Academy." In the 1930s and 40s the Cain's served as a "dime-a-dance", offering dance lessons for ten cents.

Bob Wills came to Tulsa in the 1930s after parting ways with his manager, who retaliated by barring him from performing on Texas and Oklahoma City radio stations. After impressing the reluctant station manager at KVOO-AM, Wills began performing almost daily on broadcast from the Cain's. His first concert at the Cain's was on New Year's Night in 1935. It was during his performances at the Cain's that Wills popularized the Western swing genre. Wills performed at the Cain's regularly until 1943, when he left Tulsa to pursue other interests, with his brother Johnnie Lee Wills taking over regular concert duties. Today, the venue has a banner above the main stage that states "Home of Bob Wills".

While much of Tulsa was segregated at the time, the Cain's regularly booked black artists such as Count Basie and Ernie Fields. However, in the late 40s and 50s, the Cain's declined in popularity as public perception of the venue soured. Poor management led to the venue being "virtually empty" through the 60s. The venue was bought in 1972 by Marie Meyers, an elderly woman who unsuccessfully attempted to bring dances back to the ballroom.

In 1976, concert promoter Larry Shaeffer purchased the venue for $60,000, money he had earned from booking a Peter Frampton concert at the Tulsa Fairgrounds Speedway that same year. It was during Shaeffer's ownership that several popular rock acts of the time were booked at the Cain's, including native Oklahoman Leon Russell. The venue also became known as a spot for "baby bands", emerging musicians, to perform.

Shaeffer owned the Cain's up until 1999, operating it even while touring with Hank Williams Jr. He sold the ballroom that year to brothers Danny and Mark Finnerty, for little. During this time rumors spread that the Cain's Ballroom was shut down for good. While plans were made for the brothers to retain the venue, eventually it was sold in 2002.

In 2002, the Cain's was purchased by James Rodgers, a neurosurgeon, and his wife Alice. The Rodgers family has owned the venue since. The building was in disrepair and needed several renovations to bring it to modern standards. Dwight Yoakam was the first artist to perform there after these renovations. By 2013, it was co-owned by James and Alice's sons, Chad and Hunter Rodgers.

As of the 2020s, the venue has been a hotspot for local Oklahoman artists such as JD McPherson and Wyatt Flores It is seen as a "you made it" milestone for local artists.

== Notable performances ==
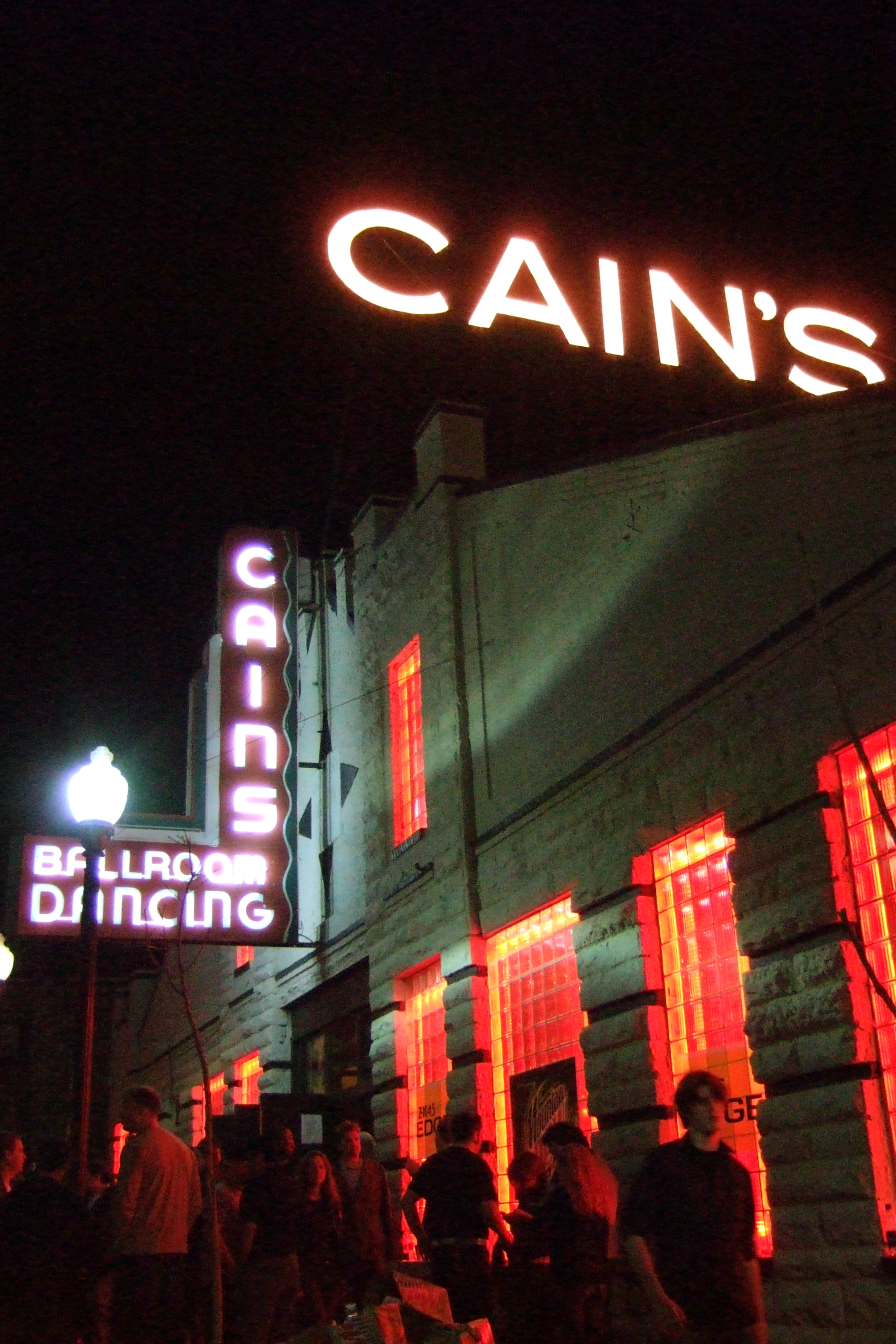
Cain's Ballroom at night

The venue was one of only seven played by the Sex Pistols in 1978 during their only North American tour. The band appeared January 11, 1978. After the show, a frustrated Sid Vicious punched a hole in the drywall of the green room. The wall section with the hole has since been removed and is preserved and on display at Cain’s.

Since 2010, Jack White has performed at the Cain's, apparently a favorite of his. The performances included a three-night stand in 2019 with The Raconteurs and a surprise show in 2024.

Other performers have performed surprise pop-up shows at the venue, the earliest being an appearance from Eric Clapton at a show in 1975. Green Day held a concert at one day's notice in 2021 celebrating the "music world bounce back" from the COVID-19 pandemic,

== Influence and legacy ==
Cain's Ballroom is frequently referred to as a historic part of downtown Tulsa. It has become a beacon for red dirt musicians, and a frequent bucket list item. "Cain's Dancing Academy" was listed in the National Register of Historical Places in 2003. In 2020 the Los Angeles Times ranked it no. 4 on their list of "12 best places to hear live music in America". In 2021, Pollstar ranked it no. 13 worldwide for ticket sales at club venues.

In 2024 the Cain's celebrated its 100th anniversary with a series of concerts throughout the year. Plans were announced for a documentary titled Raisin' Cain, directed by Tate Wittenberg. Cameraman Michael Peyton Jr. provided footage from his decades of working in the Cain's. As of October 2025, the film has yet to have been released.
