= No Justice =

US musical group

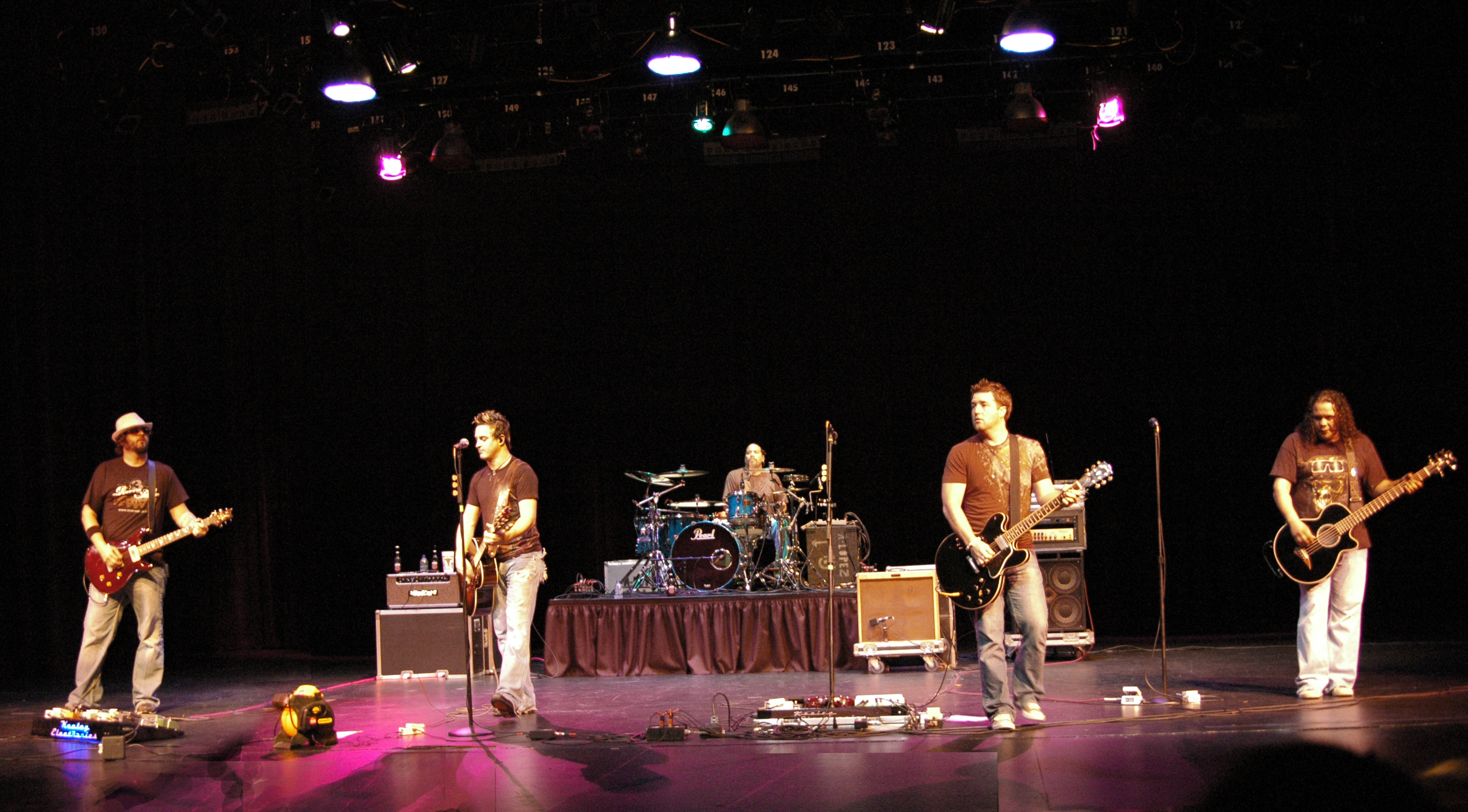
- Performing live in 2008. Left to right: Jerry Payne, Steve Rice, Armando Lopez, Brandon Jackson, Joey Trevino

Background information
- Origin: Stillwater, Oklahoma, United States
- Genres: Country, red dirt, Americana
- Years active: 2001–current
- Labels: BMI (2003–2004); Smith Music Group (2006–2008); Carved Records (2009–Present)
- Members: Steve Rice; Tyler Paul; Joey Trevino; Bryce Conway; Cody Patton
- Past members: Tony Payne; Brandon Jackson; Justin Morris; Jerry Payne; Armando Lopez; Alan Orebaugh

No Justice is an American red dirt/Texas country band which was originally from Stillwater, Oklahoma.

== History ==
The band was formed in 2001. It has its origins in a covers band that included Jerry Payne and two of the other original members, adopting the name No Justice. They began writing original songs and recruited local artist Steve Rice on lead vocals and guitar.

In September 2007, No Justice released their first live album, Live at Billy Bob's CD/DVD, joining a long list of artists in the Live at Billy Bob's series. Originally released as a limited edition CD/DVD combo, it was re-released in 2008 with the full track listing. The album included the band's more popular songs from the previous albums, as well as three new tracks, two of which were also included as studio recordings. At the end of the last track of live recording, the band included their own version of U2's "With or Without You", from the 1987 album The Joshua Tree. A cover of Ryan Adams' "Shakedown on 9th Street", from the 2000 album Heartbreaker is included, as well as a cover version of Todd Snider's "Horseshoe Lake", from the 2005 album That Was Me: Best Of. The original limited edition issue consisted of CD containing a condensed version of the live recording, as well as a DVD of the concert and bonus features, including a photo gallery and interviews with the band.

By late 2009, the group had landed a new record deal with Carved Records. In 2010, the band's lineup was singer/guitarist Steve Rice, guitarist Jerry Payne, bassist Joey Treviño (who joined in 2008), drummer Armando Lopez and lead guitarist Cody Patton.

2nd Avenue (2010) was more rock-oriented than their earlier work, but the band returned to their roots with America's Son (2012), produced by Dexter Green. By 2012 the band's lineup was Rice, Patton, Lopez, vocalist/bassist Justin Morris, and keyboard player Bryce Conway.

== Current band status ==
On September 5, 2013, No Justice announced via their Facebook page that the band would be splitting up. The final tour ended in October at the Wormy Dog Saloon in OKC, Oklahoma. The band started playing select shows again in 2015 and still plays at select venues currently. No Justice teamed up with Red 11 Music and producer Dex Green to record a 3-song EP in May 2019. They are currently not on tour but playing select venues throughout the country.

== Musical style ==
While often categorized as 'Red Dirt', the band's music incorporates country, rock, R&B, blues, and funk. Singer Rice described the band's sound as an "Americana-Southern Rock blend".

== Discography ==
=== Albums ===
Title	Album details	Tracks	Peak chart positions	
Title	Album details	Tracks	US Country	US Heat
Far from Everything	Release date: May 7, 2003; Label: BMI; Produced by J.J Lester	1. "Twenty Four Days" (Steve Rice) – 2:58; 2. "Only You" (Steve Rice, Chad Dorman) – 3:27; 3. "The Toast" (Steve Rice) – 3:51; 4. "House of Pain" (Steve Rice, Tony Payne) – 2:40; 5. "Feels Like Rain" (Steve Rice, Tony Payne) – 3:30; 6. "Three Verses" (Steve Rice) – 5:00; 7. "Devil's Road" (Steve Rice, Tony Payne) – 4:01; 8. "Turn To Smile" (Steve Rice) – 3:24; 9. "Far From Everything" (Steve Rice, Tony Payne) – 2:47; 10. "Self-Expression" (Steve Rice, Tony Payne) – 2:35; 11. "Shine A Light" (Steve Rice) – 3:23; 12. "Mexican Morning" (Bob Childers) – 3:23	—	—
No Justice	Release date: March 7, 2006; Label: Smith Music Group; Produced by J.J. Lester & Eric Delegard	1. "Never Come Back" (Steve Rice) – 3:16; 2. "Don't Walk Away" (Stephen Allen Davis, Boo Hewerdine) – 4:05; 3. "Red Dress" (Steve Rice) – 3:37; 4. "Bend But Don't Break" (George DeVore) – 3:45; 5. "By My Side" (Tony Payne, Steve Rice, Brandon Jackson, Colin Boyd) – 3:27; 6. "Circles" (Edward Apphel) – 3:23; 7. "Who I Want To Be" (Eric Landes) – 3:42; 8. "Way Down" (Bobby Pinson, Jeremy Spillman) – 3:49; 9. "Breathe" (Tony Payne, Steve Rice, Jackson) – 3:08; 10. "Still Missing You" (Tony Payne, Steve Rice, Jackson) – 3:00	—	—
Live at Billy Bob's Texas	Release date: April 29, 2008; Label: Smith Music Group	1. "Never Come Back" (Steve Rice) – 3:35; 2. "Still Missing You" (Tony Payne, Steve Rice, Brandon Jackson) – 3:00; 3. "By My Side" (Payne, Steve Rice, Jackson, Colin Boyd) – 3:44; 4. "Shakedown on 9th Street" (Ryan Adams) – 3:25; 5. "Red Dress" (Steve Rice) – 4:11; 6. "Don't Walk Away" (Stephen Allen Davis, Boo Hewerdine) – 4:18; 7. "Spinning Wheel" (Steve Rice) – 3:58; 8. "Breathe" (Payne, Steve Rice, Jackson) – 3:08; 9. "Horseshoe Lake" (Todd Snider) – 4:58; 10. "Bend But Don't Break" (George DeVore) – 3:45; 11. "Twenty Four Days" (Steve Rice) – 3:00; 12. "Who I Want To Be" (Eric Landes) – 3:48; 13. "Three Verses" (Steve Rice) – 5:00; 14. "Circles" (Edward Apphel) – 3:28; 15. "The Toast" (Steve Rice) – 3:59; 16. "Only You/With or Without You" (Steve Rice, Chad Dorman)/(Bono) – 8:23; 17. "Horseshoe Lake" – 5:00 (Studio Version); 18. "Spinning Wheel" – 4:00 (Studio Version); Limited Edition CD/DVD Combo tracks "Never Come Back" / "By My Side" / "Shakedown on 9th Street" / "Red Dress" / "Don't Walk Away" / "Spinning Wheel" / "Horseshoe Lake" / "Bend But Don't Break" / "Who I Want To Be" / "Circles" / "The Toast"	—	—
2nd Avenue	Release date: July 6, 2010; Label: Carved Records	1. Going Nowhere- (Steve Rice, Ingersol); 2. WWIII- (Devore); 3. 2nd Avenue- (Steve Rice, Green); 4. 5 More Minutes- (Steve Rice); 5. Just Get Going- (Steve Rice, Ingersol); 6. Coming Up The River; 7. Love Song- (Steve Rice); 8. Gone Ain't Far Enough- (Steve Rice, Ingersol); 9. Broken Heart Tattoo- (Steve Rice); 10. Heart On A Chain- (Steve Rice)	53	22
America's Son	Release date: December 4, 2012; Label: Smith Entertainment	1. Never Gonna Be Enough 3:44- (Steve Rice); 2. Life's Too Short 3:17- (Steve Rice, Ingersol, Wilmon); 3. Songs on the Radio 4:24- (Steve Rice); 4. Red Dress 5:15- (Steve Rice); 5. Shot in the Dark 3:15- (Steve Rice, Morris); 6. Run Away With Me 4:15- (Steve Rice, Morris); 7. America's Son 4:02- (Steve Rice); 8. Give You A Ring 3:52- (Steve Rice, Casey Donahew); 9. Let's Not Say Goodbye Again 3:29- (Steve Rice, Casey Donahew); 10. Don't Walk Away 5:25- (Stephen Allen Davis, Boo Hewerdine)	—	36
No Justice EP	Release date: July 12, 2019; Label: Smith Entertainment			

1. More to live For 3:33- (Steve Rice)
2. *more songs to come throughout 2019.

=== Music videos ===
Year	Video	Director
2010	"Just Get Going"	Charlie Stout

Year	Video	Director
2012	"Songs on the Radio"	N/A
