= The Great Divide (band) =

American Red Dirt music group

- The Great Divide, 1998

Background information
- Origin: Stillwater, Oklahoma, United States
- Genres: Country, Red Dirt
- Years active: 1992–2007, 2011 - Present
- Labels: Campfire; Atlantic; Broken Bow
- Members: Mike McClure; Scott Lester; Kelley Green; J. J. Lester; Bryce Conway
- Past members: Micah Aills
- Website: https://www.tgdmusic.com https://www.facebook.com/thegreatdividemusic

The Great Divide is an American Red Dirt music group, originally from Stillwater, Oklahoma. The Great Divide formed its own record label, publishing company and operating company, and began recording. The group's first two albums, Goin' for Broke and Break in the Storm, were independent releases. Atlantic Records signed the group and re-released Break in the Storm as well as the band's third album, Revolutions. Remain, the group's fifth album, was released independently at the end of 2002.

The Great Divide originally consisted of bassist Kelley Green, singer-songwriter Mike McClure and brothers Scott and J.J. Lester (rhythm guitar and drums, respectively). McClure left the band in early 2003 to pursue a career highlighting his originals and helping other bands record albums. The band continued with new singer Micah Aills but broke up after the release of "Under Your Own Sun" in 2005.

On August 26, 2011, the original members reunited for an appearance and are still together today touring. The compilation album "25 Years of the Great Divide", comprising 31 tracks, was released to celebrate their 25th anniversary in 2018. On August 26, 2022, the band released "Good Side" as a single from the "Providence" album. "Good Side" was recognized as the Texas County Music Association's single of the year for 2023. The same year The Great Divide was recognized as the band of the year.

The band made their debut on the Grand Ole Opry on July 10, 2024. The band opened with the song Never Could and played Mr. Devil.

== Awards and Achievements ==
=== 2025 Oklahoma Music Hall of Fame Inductions ===
The Oklahoma Music Hall of Fame inducted Stoney LaRue, Jason Boland & The Stragglers, The Great Divide, and Cross Canadian Ragweed during a special ceremony held on Saturday, April 12, 2025, during the Boys from Oklahoma concert series.

The induction took place between performances by the Turnpike Troubadours and Cross Canadian Ragweed, celebrating the legacy and influence of Oklahoma’s Red Dirt music scene. All four inductees are regarded as pioneers of the genre, known for shaping the musical identity of the region.

=== Additional Honors ===
2023 Country Band of the Year - Texas Country Music Association
2023 Single of the Year - Good Side - Texas County Music Association

== Discography ==
=== Albums ===
Year	Title	US Country
1995	Goin' for Broke	
1998	Break in the Storm	69
1999	Revolutions	73
2000	Afterglow: The Will Rogers Sessions	
2001	Dirt and Spirit	
2002	Remain	
2005	Under Your Own Sun	
2018	25 Years of the Great Divide	
2022	Providence	

=== Singles ===
Year	Title	US Country	Album
1998	"Never Could"	74	Break in the Storm
1998	"Pour Me a Vacation"	59	Break in the Storm
1999	"San Isabella"		Revolutions
2001	"Out of Here Tonight"		Afterglow: The Will Rogers Sessions
2001	"Days Go"		Afterglow: The Will Rogers Sessions
2001	"Wild Horses"		Afterglow: The Will Rogers Sessions
2002	"Lost in the Night"		Remain
2004	"Freedom"		Single only
2005	"Crazy in California"		Under Your Own Sun
2006	"The Plan"		Under Your Own Sun
2022	"Good Side"		Providence

=== Music videos ===
Year	Video	Director
1998	"Never Could"	Bob Gabrielsen
1998	"Pour Me a Vacation"	Bob Gabrielsen
1999	"San Isabella"	Bob Gabrielsen
2001	"Out of Here Tonight"	Peter Zavadil
