= Stoney LaRue =

American musician (born 1977)

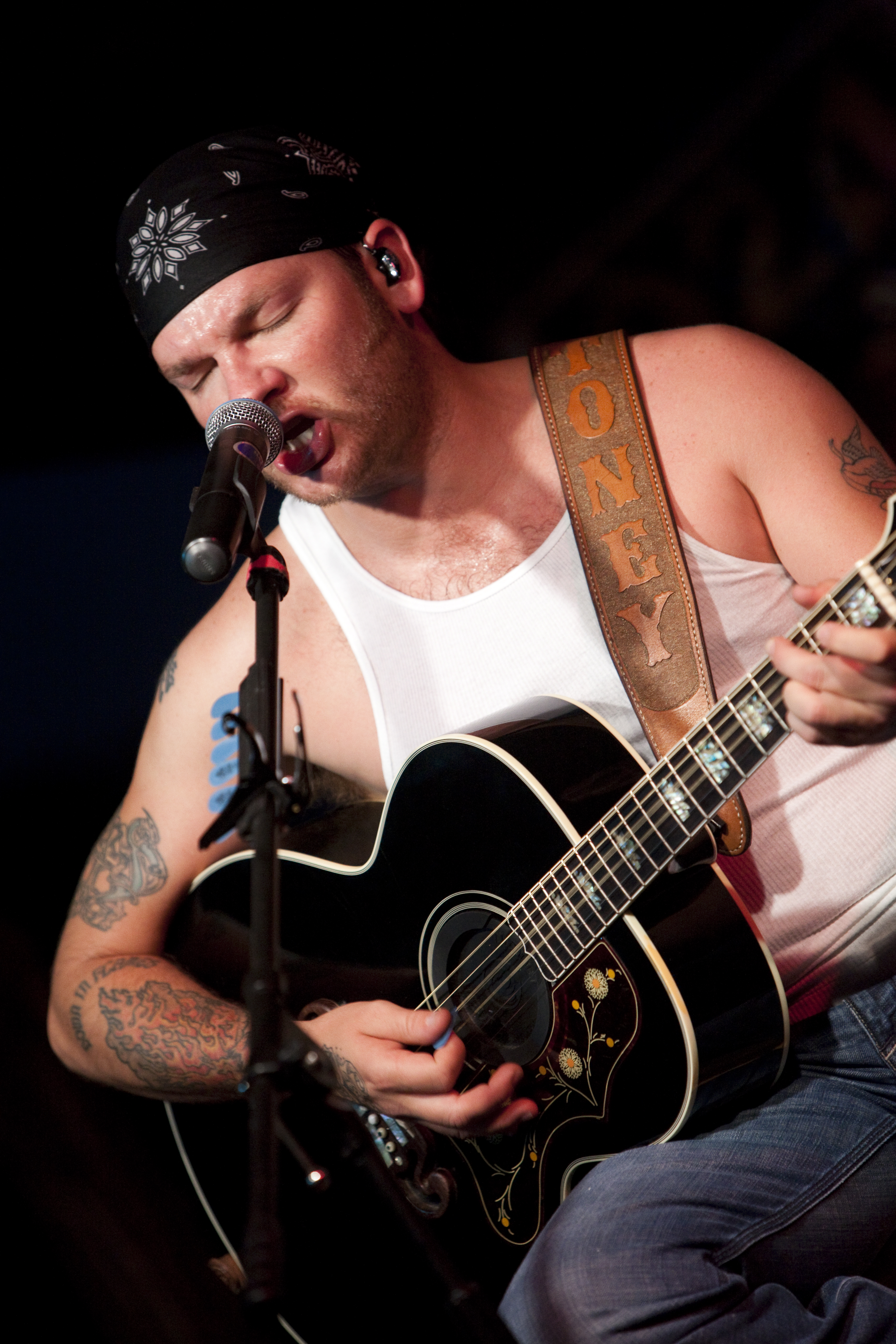
- LaRue in 2014
- Born: Stoney Larue Phillips; Taft, Texas, US
- Occupation: Musician
- Years active: 2002–present
- Musical career
- Genres: Red dirt; Texas country
- Label: Smith Music Group
- Formerly of: Stoney LaRue and the Organic Boogie Band
- Website: www.stoneylarue.com

Stoney LaRue (born Stoney Larue Phillips; 1977) is an American Texas country/Red dirt artist.

== Life and career ==
Born in Taft, Texas, LaRue was raised in Yanush/Buffalo Valley, Oklahoma, where he still visits regularly and began playing country music at a young age.

LaRue moved to Stillwater, Oklahoma, and began to play in the various bars around the college town, as well as his brother, Bo Phillips. He befriended Jason Boland and Cody Canada and the three moved into the infamous "Yellow House" where they would have late night jam sessions and entertain other various musicians around the town, like Mike McClure and Brandon Jenkins. LaRue was heavily influenced by Woody Guthrie, Bob Childers, Mike Hosty and the "Red Dirt" music scene.

In 2002, LaRue led The Organic Boogie Band and released Downtown, recorded in private sessions at Cain's Ballroom in Tulsa. LaRue's 2005 follow-up, The Red Dirt Album, reached the Billboard sales charts in its debut week. The next year, Stoney released his first live record Live at Billy Bob's Texas.

LaRue sang backing vocals on Miranda Lambert's 2013 single "All Kinds of Kinds."

LaRue is also a Freemason and served as the Grand Lodge of Texas' Grand Musician in 2026.

== Legal issues ==
On the morning of July 20, 2015, LaRue was arrested and charged with domestic abuse after an altercation involving his then girlfriend Amanda Winsworth. Winsworth claimed in court documents that she was getting ready for work when LaRue began physically assaulting her and ultimately pushed her down a flight of stairs in their home. LaRue was released from jail on $4,000 bond (equivalent to $5,400 in 2025) later that day. The next morning, Winsworth rescinded part of her account of the assault on Twitter stating that the incident had been blown out of proportion by the media.

== Discography ==
=== Albums ===
Title	Album details	Peak chart positions		
Title	Album details	US Country	US	US Indie
Downtown (Stoney LaRue and the Organic Boogie Band)	Release date: 2002; Label: released by Stoney LaRue.	—	—	—
The Red Dirt Album	Release date: August 23, 2005; Label: Smith Music Group	70	—	—
Live at Billy Bob's Texas	Release date: April 10, 2007; Label: Smith Music Group	65	—	—
Live Acoustic (EP)	Release date: December 29, 2009; Label: Smith Music Group	66	—	—
Velvet	Release date: August 30, 2011; Label: B Side Music Group	15	53	5
Aviator	Release date: October 28, 2014; Label: eOne Music	17	72	15
Us Time	Release date: October 16, 2015; Label: eOne Music	22	—	40
Onward	Release date: November 1, 2019; Label: One Chord Song	—	—	—
"—" denotes releases that did not chart

=== Music videos ===
Year	Title	Director
2011	"Travelin' Kind"	
2014	"First One to Know"	Coleman Saunders
2014	"Aviator"	Coleman Saunders
2017	"Blending Colors"	Coleman Saunders

=== 2025 Oklahoma Music Hall of Fame Inductions ===
The Oklahoma Music Hall of Fame inducted Stoney LaRue, Jason Boland & The Stragglers, The Great Divide, and Cross Canadian Ragweed during a special ceremony held on Saturday, April 12, 2025, during the Boys from Oklahoma concert series.

The induction took place between performances by the Turnpike Troubadours and Cross Canadian Ragweed, celebrating the legacy and influence of Oklahoma’s Red Dirt music scene. All four inductees are regarded as pioneers of the genre, known for shaping the musical identity of the region.
