= Mike McClure =

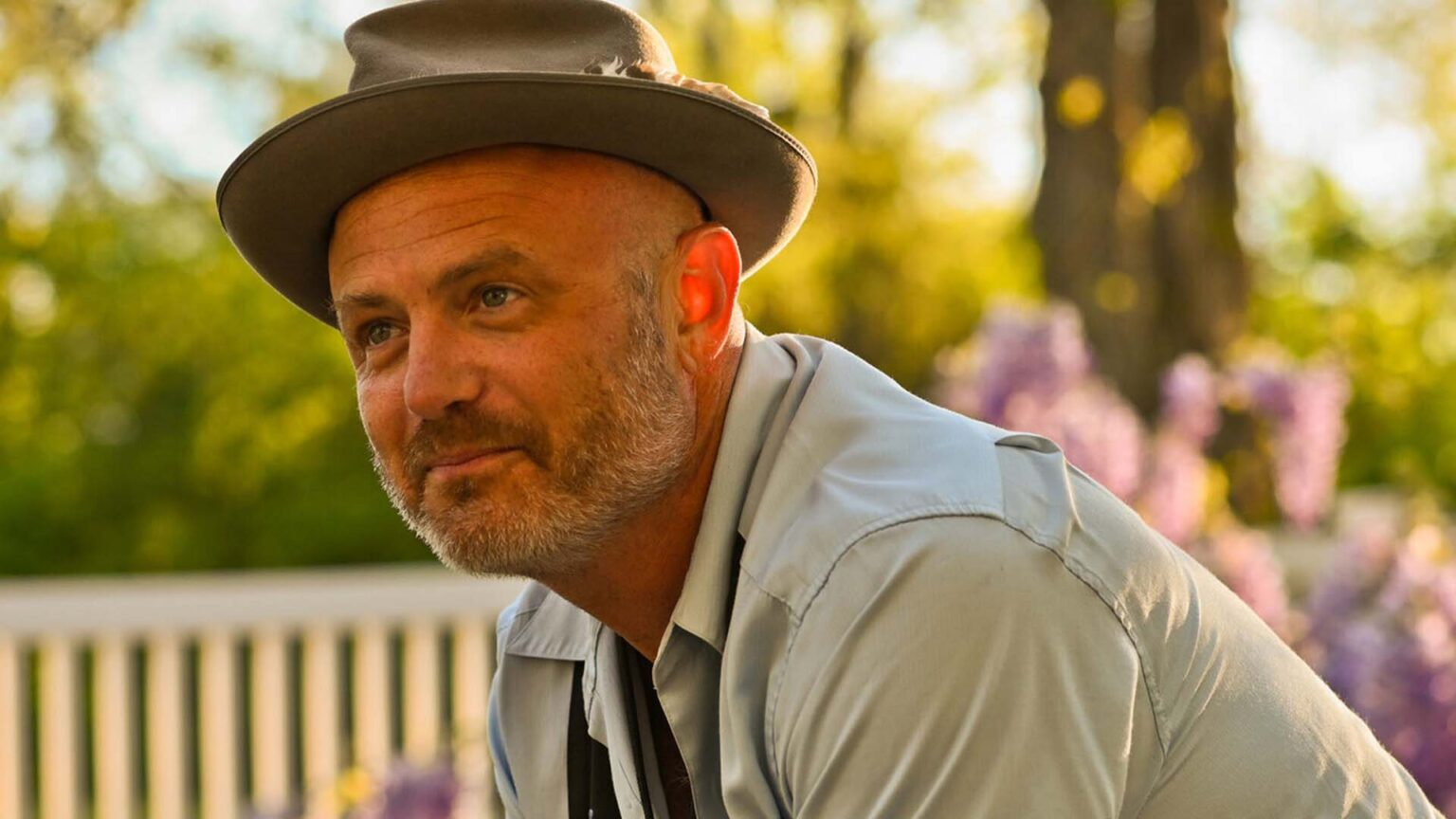

Background information
- Born: July 6, 1971 (age 54)
- Origin: Tecumseh, Oklahoma, United States
- Genres: Roots rock; country rock; grunge; alternative country; Red Dirt
- Years active: 1992-present
- Label: None
- Website: http://www.mikemcclureband.com - http://mikemcclureband.net

Mike McClure (born July 6, 1971) is a singer, songwriter and producer from Tecumseh, Oklahoma. McClure is a founding member of The Great Divide, and was a member until he and the band parted ways in 2002. TGD reformed in 2011 with the original line up and is still actively touring.

Current projects include folk duo, Crow and Gazelle featuring McClure with his partner and wife Chrislyn Lawrence. They have released two albums; "As Above Now So Below" (2024) and "Truth Be Told" (2026)

McClure got his start in Stillwater, Oklahoma at The Wormy Dog Saloon and would hang out and play music at the notorious "Farm" with other Red Dirt artists such as Bob Childers, Tom Skinner, and Scott Evans. After forming The Great Divide with J.J. Lester, Scotte Lester, and Kelley Green in 1992 and contributing to six studio albums and one live two-part album, McClure set out to do his own thing.

In 2002, while still a member of The Great Divide, he released Twelve Pieces, his first solo album. When Mcclure initially formed his own band, it featured Les Paul Clanton on bass and Rodney Pyeatt on guitar. Both went to do other projects. After recruiting Tom Skinner (bass) and Eric Hansen (drums), McClure had his band together. In 2004, The Mike McClure Band released their first album Everything Upside Down, a hard-hitting rock album. McClure often uses the quote that his new band is "twice as loud, and half as popular." Since the first album, the band has put out seven more albums, including the 2004 collaboration with the Burtschi Brothers of Norman, Oklahoma. After the death of Tom Skinner in July 2015 and the departure of Hansen, the band took on its current look.

As a songwriter and producer, McClure has collaborated with many other Red Dirt artists. He has become the permanent producer for Cross Canadian Ragweed. Usually contributing also as a songwriter, he has produced five of their seven studio albums, jokingly earning him the title of "prodouchebag". McClure has also produced albums by other artists around the scene such as Stoney LaRue, Jason Boland & the Stragglers, Scott Copeland, Johnny Cooper, Whiskey Myers, Katie Butts and the Turnpike Troubadours.

In 2011, McClure produced and recorded with The Damn Quails, releasing "Down the Hatch" in October 2011. Produced with Chance Sparkman.

On February 27, 2022, he was inducted as a solo artist into the Oklahoma Music Hall of Fame and again on April 12, 2025 as a member of The Great Divide.

== Discography ==
Year	Album
2002	Twelve Pieces
2004	Everything Upside Down
2004	The Burtschi Brothers & The Mike McClure Band
2005	Camelot Falling
2006	Foam
2008	did7
2009	Onion
2010	Zero Dark 30
2010	Halfway Out of the Woods
2011	50 Billion

=== Music videos ===
Year	Video
2006	"Haunt Me No More"

== Notable appearances ==
"I'd Rather Have Nothing", written by McClure and originally recorded by The Great Divide was recorded by Garth Brooks for his 2005 Limited Series Box Set on the album The Lost Sessions. It has sold over 2 million copies.

"Fighting For", written by McClure and Cody Canada reached number 39 on the Billboard Hot Country Songs chart. It was recorded by Cross Canadian Ragweed for their album Garage.

McClure has been working with Joe Hardy since "Foam".
