= Red dirt music =

Genre of country music

Red dirt
- Stylistic origins: Contemporary folk; Texas country; Americana; honky-tonk; Western swing; bluegrass; country rock; Southern rock; Tulsa sound; outlaw country
- Cultural origins: Late 20th century, Oklahoma and North Texas, United States
- Typical instruments: Guitar; fiddle; steel guitar; Dobro; harmonica; bass guitar; drums; mandolin; banjo

Red dirt is a genre of country music that gets its name from the color of soil found in Oklahoma. Many red dirt acts got their start in bars surrounding Oklahoma State University in Stillwater, a city considered to be the center of red dirt music. The genre also extends to music made south of the Red River in Texas. Outlaw country legends Waylon Jennings and Willie Nelson have been associated with the distinctive Texas sound, while the late Oklahoma singer-songwriter Bob Childers is widely recognized as the Father of Oklahoma red dirt music. At one time, the distinction between the two genres was sonically obvious; however, by 2008, that gap had diminished.

== History ==
Oklahoma has been the source of several pop music movements that can be traced not only to a specific city but to a specific location within the city. Those music scenes include Western swing (attributed to Cain's Ballroom in Tulsa), and Leon Russell's Tulsa sound from his Tulsa church-turned-studio called The Church Studio. Like those two, red dirt music grew from a specific place in Stillwater. The place was an old two-story, five-bedroom house called "The Farm", for two decades the center of what evolved into the red dirt scene. The house, located on the outskirts of Stillwater, was the country home of Bob Childers. Eventually Childers left The Farm, but the red dirt scene continued to grow and thrive. Childers said, "I found something in Stillwater that I just didn't find anywhere else. And I looked everywhere from Nashville to Austin. I always came back to Stillwater—it's like a fountainhead for folks trying to get their vision." The first usage of "red dirt" was by Steve Ripley's band Moses when the group chose the label name Red Dirt Records for their 1972 self-published live album.

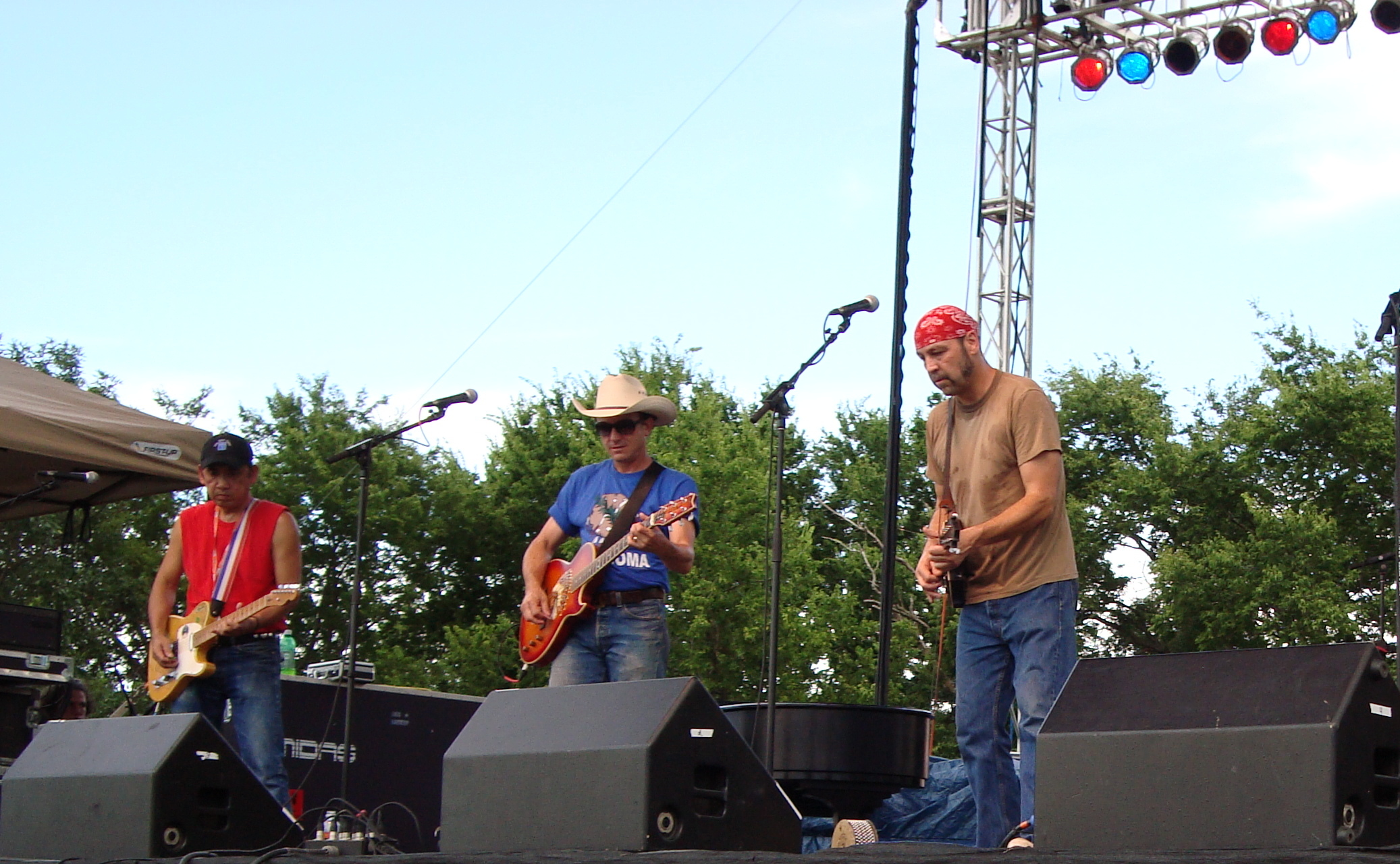
The Red Dirt Rangers (Ben Han, Brad Piccolo, John Cooper) performing at the Woody Guthrie Folk Festival. July 12, 2008.

One of many bands representing red dirt music—as their name signifies—is the Red Dirt Rangers. The Rangers (John Cooper, Brad Piccolo and Ben Han) have been making music since the late 1980s and, along with Childers, were part of The Farm's earliest musical brotherhood, which also included Jimmy LaFave and Tom Skinner. These musicians and others jammed in the living room, on the front porch, in the garage (known as the Gypsy Cafe), and around campfires in the yard where "the sheer joy of creating music with friends transcended everything else." Cooper said, "The Farm was as much an attitude as a physical structure. It allowed a setting where freedom rang and all things were possible. Out of this setting came the music." The physical structure burned down in 2003.

== Definition ==
Critics say that red dirt can best be likened to indie rock as there is no definitive sound that can be attributed to all the bands in the movement. Most red dirt artists would be classified by the music industry as Americana, folk, or alt-country, though the range of sounds in the red dirt spectrum goes beyond these genres. It has been described as a mix of folk, rock, country, bluegrass, blues, Western swing, and honky tonk, with even a few Mexican influences. Singer-songwriter and former Stillwater resident Jimmy LaFave said,

"It's kind of hard to put into words, but if you ever drive down on the (Mississippi) Delta, you can almost hear that blues sound," he explains. "Go to New Orleans, and you can almost hear the Dixieland jazz. Go to San Francisco, and you get that psychedelic-music vibe. You hear the red dirt sound when you go through Stillwater. It has to do with the spirit of the people. There's something different about them. They're not Texans, they're Okies, and I think the whole red dirt sound is just as important to American musicology as the San Francisco sound or any of the rest. It's distinctly its own thing."

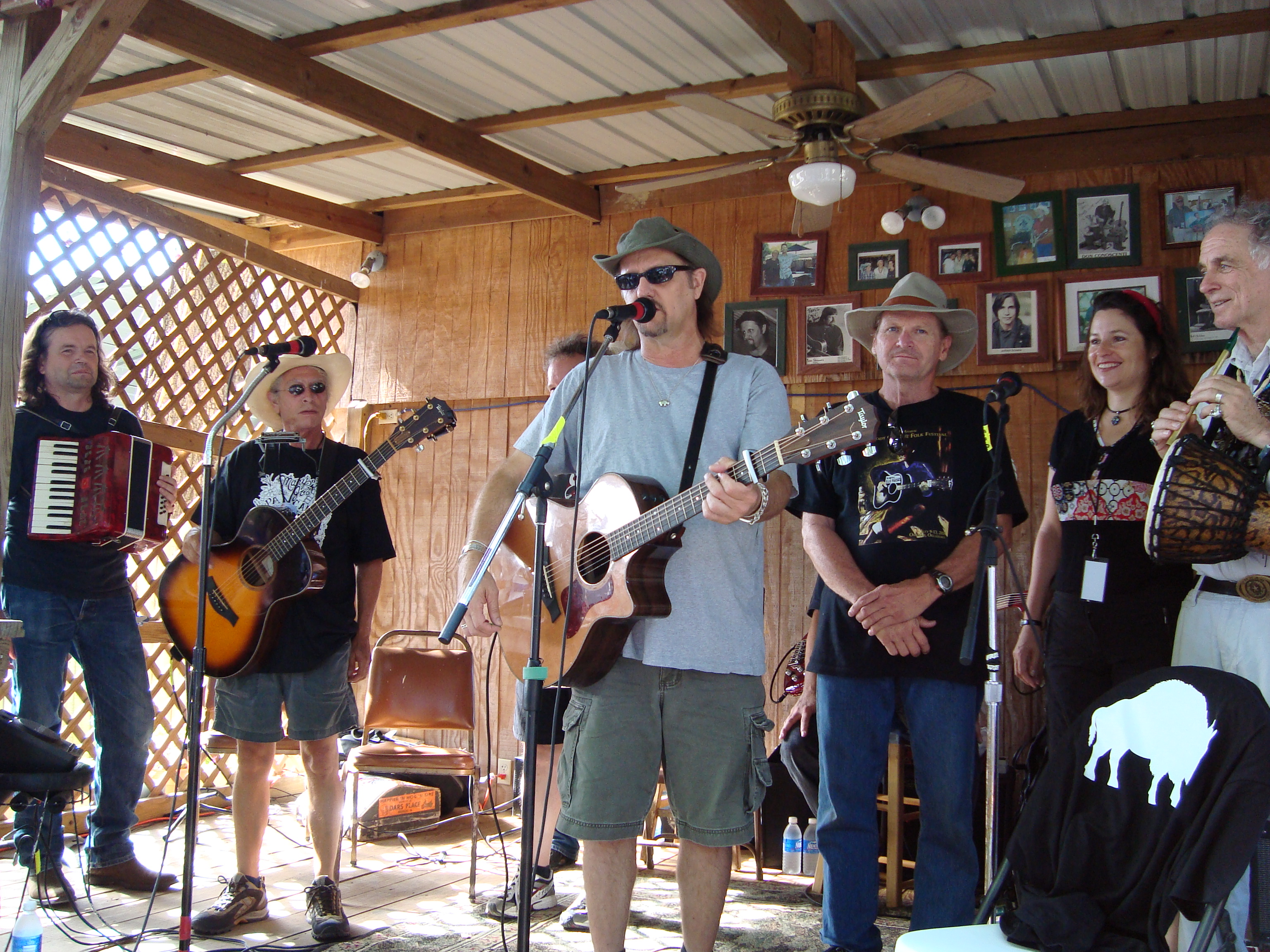
Jimmy LaFave performing at the Woody Guthrie Folk Festival with (L–R) Radoslav Lorković, Joel Rafael, Butch Hancock, Audrey Auld Mezera and David Amram, July 12, 2008

Some define red dirt music as "country music with an attitude". Others say it's a state of mind as much as it is a sound – a sound that successfully closes the gap between rock and country.

“Although many bands got their start in Stillwater, each band has a distinctive sound,” said Brandon Jackson, guitarist for the band No Justice. “The sound is different from each band to band to band. Some guys are more rock, some guys are more country, and there's everything in between,” Jackson said. Cody Canada, front-man for the band Cross Canadian Ragweed said, "It's country, folksy, it's bluesy, it's rock, and it's just blue collar music. It's a lot about the lyrics. It's a lot about the feeling of it. It doesn't have a label, I guess. It's everything from Merle Haggard influence to full blown Rolling Stones."

Marc Ringwood, founder of Texas Troubadours – a website dedicated to the sounds of Oklahoma and Texas – says, "I don't think there is a true way to define it. Trying to analyze it, you see that a lot of artists carry the same influences going back to the days of Bob Wills and Woody Guthrie (for the older artists and bands), and then you have new guys who have followed in stride with their peers by feeding off their influences. Red dirt also has more of a spiritual quality within the music. It's more honest, and true and noncliched, like a lot of other music we're exposed to in major markets."

When asked to define red dirt music in an interview with Texas Troubadours, red dirt musician and Tahlequah resident Randy Crouch said, "Well, I don't think I'd be the one who's able to define it, but it seems to have Oklahoma values, you know how Okies are real good at doing everything themselves, maybe a sense of independence about it. It's natural, and honest, and about real life. You know, it's almost like the way Woody approached music."

Ben Cisneros, a writer for Engine 145 – a country music blog website – says red dirt is a "movement" that has managed to create an infrastructure enabling regional success. He states that "program directors and DJs all over Texas and Oklahoma have set up shows that feature red dirt music. Not only that, but many stations in major markets are including red dirt music in their regular rotation right alongside mainstream modern country."

== Musicians and festivals ==
Stillwater resident Bob Childers, who died in April 2008, was known as the Godfather of Red Dirt Music. Five years prior to his death, Childers was inducted into the Oklahoma Music Awards Red Dirt Hall of Fame along with Steve Ripley and Tom Skinner. The three awardees performed at the ceremony for the First Annual Red Dirt Music Awards held on Sunday, November 9, 2003, at Cain's Ballroom in Tulsa. Other performers at the awards ceremony included the Great Divide, Susan Gibson, Wade Bowen, Brandon Jenkins, Stoney LaRue, the Mike McClure Band, Jason Boland, Cody Canada, Susan Herndon and others.

Many music festivals include representatives of the red dirt sound. These include FarmFest, WoodyFest, Calffry, Shrinefest, and others. In 2007, Cross Canadian Ragweed's Red Dirt Round Up in Fort Worth, Texas had 15,000 in attendance. In August 2008, the 4th annual Red Dirt Festival was held at the Grape Ranch Winery in Okemah, Oklahoma. The festival brings together wine tasting, camping and red dirt music. The winery teamed up with the Red Dirt Rangers to present the festival.

Red dirt has made its way into the heavier side of music. In 2008, Texas-based metal outfit Texas Hippie Coalition released their debut album Pride of Texas showcasing a metal sound combined with red dirt style.

The 1st Annual Texahomakan Country Music Festival was held in Caney, Kansas on June 21-22, 2013. The festival featured The Great Divide, Cody Canada & The Departed, Brandon Jenkins, and more.

== Media ==
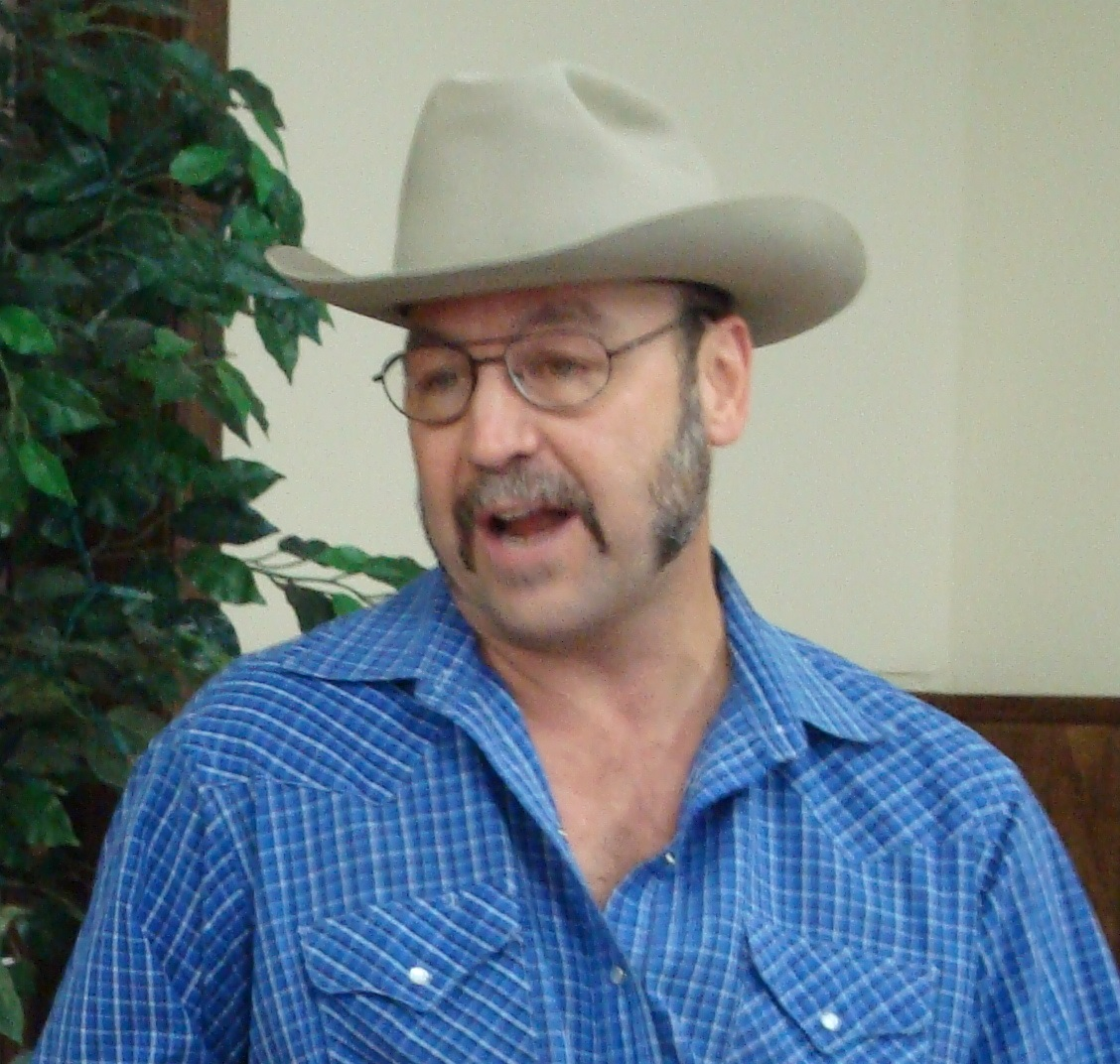
John Cooper of the Red Dirt Rangers in 2008

The Red Dirt Radio Hour debuted on Tulsa radio KVOO (the "Voice of Oklahoma") on January 26, 2003. The show was hosted by Red Dirt Rangers John Cooper and Brad Piccolo, joined by station DJ Eric Wayne. Wayne was voted Oklahoma Red Dirt DJ of the Year in 2004 and again in 2005. Although leaving KVOO in 2008, today Eric Wayne continues writing for one of the top comedians in the country, acting as road/touring manager for another Top Comedian, as well as editing novels from one of the best selling authors in the nation. Although the Sunday evening show enjoyed success for five years, KVOO cancelled the broadcast abruptly in November 2007. Various factors seemed to influence the decision made by station owners. On August 2, 2009, after an absence of nearly two years, the show returned to KVOO and can be heard on Sundays from 9 pm to 10 pm.

In 2007, students at Cameron University in Lawton, Oklahoma, produced a documentary called North of Austin/West of Nashville: Red Dirt Music which premiered at the University on July 24. The title of the film refers to names often given to the region around Stillwater, Oklahoma. The students traveled more than 4700 miles, interviewing and recording musicians such as the Red Dirt Rangers, Bob Childers, No Justice, Johnny Cooper, Brandon Jenkins, Stoney LaRue, Cross Canadian Ragweed and others. "In this film, the musicians speak openly, honestly and passionately about this unique musical form born in the heartland of the southern plains. Void of the over-polished and superficial influences of today's music marketers, these musicians live the stories that they sing about while remaining true to themselves." A screening of the film also took place at the Crystal Theater in Okemah, Oklahoma, on July 12, 2008, during the 11th Annual Woody Guthrie Folk Festival.
