= Cody Canada =

American rock/alt-country musician

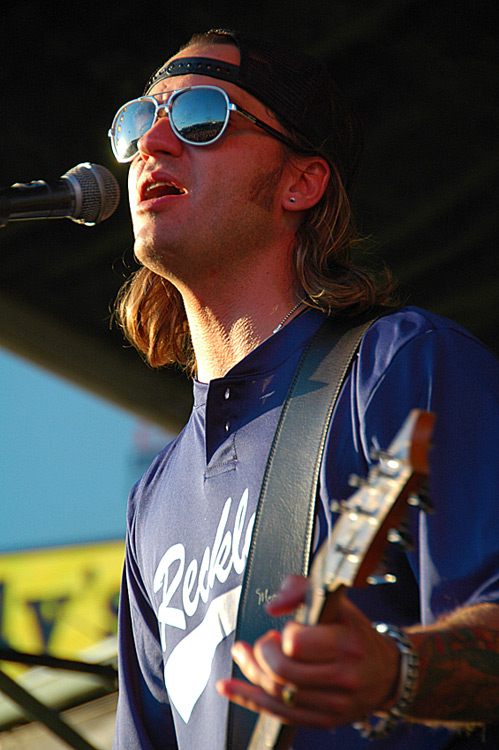
- Cody Canada performing in April 26, 2009.

Background information
- Born: May 25, 1976 (age 50)
- Origin: Stillwater, Oklahoma
- Genres: Rock, Alternative Country, Country Rock, Red Dirt
- Occupation: Singer-songwriter
- Instruments: Guitar, mandolin, harmonica
- Years active: 1994–present
- Label: Underground Sound
- Member of: Cross Canadian Ragweed; Cody Canada and The Departed
- Website: www.thedepartedmusic.com

Cody Jay Canada (born May 25, 1976) is an American rock/alt-country musician who currently is the lead singer and lead guitarist of the rock bands Cody Canada and The Departed since 2011 and Cross Canadian Ragweed from 1994 to 2010, and again since 2024.

== Early life ==
Canada was born in Pampa, Texas, in 1976. He acquired a taste for music after attending a George Strait concert with his parents at the age of four. The next day he asked for a guitar. Canada first started playing guitar at the age of eight. While Cody was a teen, the Canada family relocated to Yukon, Oklahoma. As a teenager Canada was drawn to rock bands such as Nirvana and Pearl Jam and also outlaw country.

== Cross Canadian Ragweed ==
In 1994, Canada along with fellow musicians Matt Weidemann (bass), Grady Cross (guitar), and Randy Ragsdale (percussion) formed Cross Canadian Ragweed in Yukon, Oklahoma. The band was named after the original members with Canada taking on the role of lead guitarist, lead vocals, and prominent songwriter. They would later move to Stillwater, Oklahoma. From the time of Ragweed's formation until its end in 2010, the band released seven studio albums as well as three live albums.

In 2010, the band went on an extended hiatus due to slight tensions inside the band, and Ragsdale's family responsibilities, eventually breaking up in late 2010.

== Cody Canada and The Departed ==
In 2011, Canada and Plato formed a new band, initially called Cody Canada & the Departed. The band originally consisted of Canada (guitar/vocals), Plato (bass guitar/vocals), Seth James (guitar/vocals), Steve Littleton (keyboards) and Chris Doege (drums) who replaced original drummer, Dave Bowen. They released their first album in June 2011 titled This Is Indian Land, consisting of covers written by Oklahoma songwriters.

On August 24, 2012, the band, now billing themselves as The Departed, announced through their website and social media that they would release their first original album titled Adventus. The album was released on November 13, 2012.

In September 2012, the band announced that they would release one song from Adventus every Monday leading up until the album's release on their Facebook artist profile.

In 2014 the band announced a third studio album. Hippielovepunk was released on January 13, 2015. The album debut at No. 9 on the Billboard US Country chart as well as No. 9 on the US Indie chart. The first single was a return to the Red Dirt sound of CCR titled Inbetweener.

== Solo work and collaborations ==
On November 19, 2013, Cody Canada released a solo acoustic 2-disc album Some Old, Some New, Maybe a Cover or Two. The album was recorded live at Third Coast Music in Port Aransas, Texas, with 19 songs from throughout Canada's career, including works with Cross Canadian Ragweed and The Departed.

On November 13, 2015, Cody Canada released a two-disc, 35-track album with Mike McClure, Chip and Ray, Together Again for the First Time. The album was recorded in Port Aransas, Texas, and features songs they worked on or recorded together.

== Personal life ==
Canada is married to Shannon O’Neal Canada, who also manages The Departed and their label Underground Sound. He has two sons, Dierks Cobain Canada (named after personal friend and country singer Dierks Bentley and former Nirvana lead singer Kurt Cobain), and Willy Vedder Canada (named after Reckless Kelly member Willy Braun and Pearl Jam's long time lead singer Eddie Vedder). Dierks and Willy both play in a band called Waves In April, and have been featured in live shows with Cody. He is the brother in law of fellow red dirt musician Wade Bowen, who married Shannon Canada’s sister Shelby. Cody Canada is a Christian, and has mentioned his faith and Jesus Christ in Ragweed songs "The President Song" (Live and Loud at the Wormy Dog Saloon, 2001), "Highway 377" (Highway 377, 2001), "Carry You Home" (Cross Canadian Ragweed, 2002), "Down" (Soul Gravy, 2004), and "When it All Goes Down" (Garage, 2005). Canada lives with his family in New Braunfels, Texas.

== Awards and achievements ==
2023 Trailblazer Award, Texas Country Music Association

== Discography ==
=== Studio albums ===
| Title | Album details | Peak chart positions | | |
| Title | Album details | US Country | US Indie | US Folk |
|---|---|---|---|---|
| Some Old, Some New, Maybe a Cover or Two | Release date: November 19, 2013; Label: Underground Sound | 35 | 33 | 11 |
| Chip and Ray, Together Again for the First Time (with Mike McClure) | Release date: November 13, 2015; Label: Underground Sound; Format: Digital downloads | — | — | — |
