= Terry Buffalo Ware =

American guitarist and composer (1950–2026)

- Born: February 14, 1950; Shattuck, Oklahoma, U.S.
- Origin: Norman, Oklahoma, U.S.
- Died: August 5, 2026 (aged 76)
- Genre: Rock
- Years active: 1967–2026
- Label: OkieMotion Music
- Website: terrybuffaloware.com

Terry Buffalo Ware (February 14, 1950 – August 5, 2026) was an American guitarist and composer.

== Early life ==
Ware grew up in the Northwest Oklahoma town of Woodward. He attended the University of Oklahoma and graduated in 1972 with a degree in journalism professional writing.

He studied piano for 10 years beginning at age 9. He began playing guitar at age 14, and was self-taught. He also played the trombone in his high school band, and was in the Pride of Oklahoma, the University of Oklahoma's marching band, for one year. While still in high school, Ware played guitar in The Debtor Group, which performed regularly throughout Northwest Oklahoma and the Texas panhandle. The band Sailor which Ware formed in college was a local fixture in Oklahoma music scene of the early 1970s.

== Career ==
After graduating college, Ware moved to New Mexico, where he met Ray Wylie Hubbard. He and Hubbard formed Ray Wylie Hubbard and the Cowboy Twinkies, a group which still enjoys cult status. Hubbard and the Cowboy Twinkies performed all over the country from 1973 to 1979, including a stint at the Troubadour in Los Angeles and tours with Willie Nelson.

When the Cowboy Twinkies disbanded, Ware formed The Sensational Shoes in Norman, Oklahoma. This group enjoyed great regional popularity through the mid-1980s. Ware also released his debut album Caffeine Dreams in 1981.

Ware rejoined Hubbard in 1986, and the duo performed all over the United States and overseas. Ware's guitar work on Hubbard's Lost Train of Thought (1992) was critically acclaimed, as was his work on the 1994 release Loco Gringo's Lament and 1997's Dangerous Spirits. Ware performed with Jimmy LaFave from 1997 to 2000, giving many notable performances such as the July 31, 1999, Central Park Summerstage in New York.

In 1999, Ware was named a Texas Tornado by Buddy Magazine. The Buddy Texas Tornados are "an elite corp of the Lone Star State's finest musicians."

From 2000, Ware was a freelance guitarist backing artists including Ray Wylie Hubbard, John Fullbright, Joel Rafael, Michael Fracasso, Eliza Gilkyson, Smokey & the Mirror, Bob Livingston, Audrey Auld, Susan Herndon, Wanda Jackson, Don Conoscenti, Monica Taylor, Mary Reynolds, Red Dirt Rangers, Sam Baker, Greg Jacobs, Ellis Paul, Camille Harp, Iain Matthews, Sandy Rogers, and many others.

In 2003, Ware and the legendary singer-songwriter Bob Childers recorded Two Buffalos Walking-Live at The Blue Door. With John Fullbright, he performed on the 2013 Grammy pre-telecast, and on the David Letterman show in August 2014.

He also released 12 CDs on his own label OkieMotion Records, Buffalo Tracks (2001), Ridin' the Reverb Range (2004), Reverb Confidential (2007), Reverb Babylon (2011), Everybody's Got One with Gregg Standridge (2015), Man With Guitar and Amp (2016), Aren't You a Little Old for This? (2018), Into The Dwell (2019), Isolation Reverberation (2020), Covered Tracks (2021), Buffarama Chronicles Vol. 1 (2023), and Buffarama Chronicles Vol. 2 (2024). In December 2011, Reverb Babylon was named one of the Top Ten Best Albums of 2011 by the San Antonio Express-News.

Ware performed at every Woody Guthrie Folk Festival since it began in 1998, and led the house band and served as master of ceremonies for the Hoot for Huntington's since 2003. Among the artists he backed or performed with at the festival are David Amram, Ronny Elliot, Joel Rafael, The Burns Sisters, Rob McNurlin, Emma's Revolution, Kris Delmhorst, Nancy Apple and many others.

Ware's memoir, Man with Guitar and Amp: A Sideman's Memoir, was published in 2026, shortly before his death.

== Death ==
Ware died from lung cancer on August 5, 2026, at the age of 76.

== Discography ==
- Caffeine Dreams, 1981
- Buffalo Tracks, 2001
- Two Buffalos Walking - Live at The Blue Door, Bob Childers and Terry Buffalo Ware, 2003
- Ridin' the Reverb Range, 2004
- Reverb Confidential, 2007
- Reverb Babylon, 2011
- Everybody's Got One, Terry Buffalo Ware and Gregg Standridge, 2015
- Man With Guitar and Amp, 2016
- Aren't You a Little Old for This?, 2018
- Into The Dwell, 2019
- Isolation Reverberation, 2020
- Covered Tracks, 2021
- The Buffarama Chronicles, Vol. 1, 2023
- The Buffarama Chronicles, Vol. 2, 2024

Appears on the following recordings:

- Ray Wylie Hubbard & The Cowboy Twinkies, 1975
- Off the Wall, Ray Wylie Hubbard, 1978
- The Clovis Roblaine Story, Clovis Roblaine, 1979
- Oklahoma Bossa Nova, Steve Weichert, 1979
- Lost Train of Thought, Ray Wylie Hubbard, 1992
- Loco Gringo's Lament, Ray Wylie Hubbard, 1994
- Dangerous Spirits, Ray Wylie Hubbard, 1997
- Miles from Here, Macon Greyson, 1999
- Gecko Canyon, The Banded Geckos, 2000
- Staring Down the Sun, Red Dirt Rangers, 2002
- Land of a Thousand Surf Guitars, The Plungers, 2002
- Guitars Gone Wild, The Plungers, 2003
- Evil Fuzz, Davie Allan Tribute, 2004
- Restless Spirits: A Tribute to the Songs of Bob Childers, various artists, 2004
- Bitter Sweet, Dante, 2005
- The Stone Soup Sessions, John Egenes, 2011
- The Wind and the Weeds, Wendy Allyn, 2011
- Lucky Live, Greg Jacobs, 2011
- From the Ground Up, John Fullbright, 2012
- Songs, John Fullbright, 2014
- Vagabonde, Susan Herndon, 2015
- Thin Black Line, Smokey & the Mirror, 2015

Produced the following recordings:

- Don't Let Go, T.Z. Wright, 2015
- Old Habits Die Hard, Shawna LaRee, 2015
- End of Summer, Heartbreak Rodeo, 2018
