= Woody Guthrie Folk Festival =

Annual folk festival in Oklahoma, USA

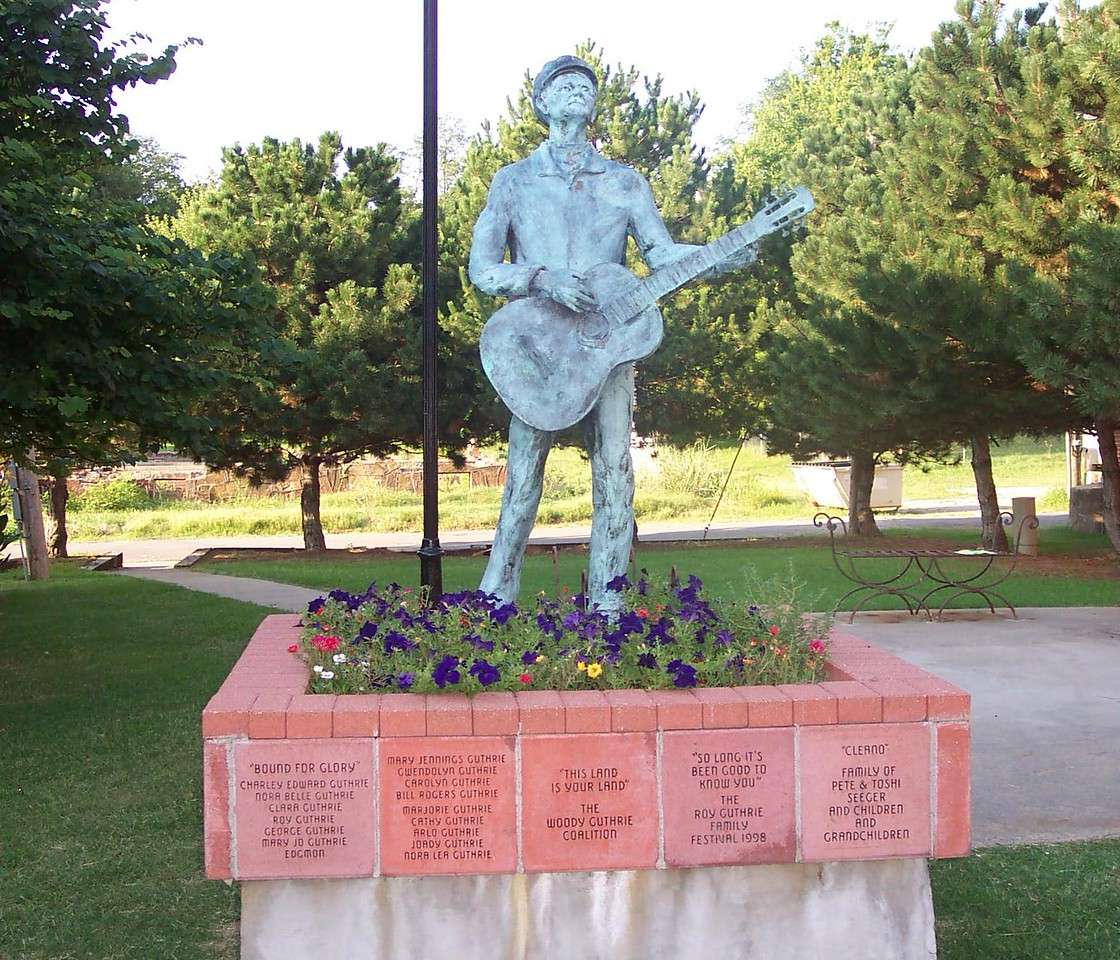
- Dan Brook sculpting of Woody Guthrie; Okemah, Oklahoma
- Genre: Folk, country, blues, folk rock, red dirt
- Dates: mid-July
- Locations: Okemah, Oklahoma
- Years active: 1998–present
- Founders: The Orphanage Society and the Woody Guthrie Coalition
- Website: Woody Guthrie Folk Festival

The Woody Guthrie Folk Festival, also known as WoodyFest, is held annually in mid-July to commemorate the life and music of Woody Guthrie. The festival is held on the weekend closest to July 14 – the date of Guthrie's birth – in Guthrie's hometown of Okemah, Oklahoma. Daytime main stage performances are held indoors at the Brick Street Cafe and the Crystal Theatre. Evening main stage performances are held outdoors at the Pastures of Plenty. The festival is planned and implemented annually by the Woody Guthrie Coalition, a non-profit corporation, whose goal is simply to ensure Guthrie's musical legacy. The event is made possible in part from a grant from the Oklahoma Arts Council. Mary Jo Guthrie Edgmon, Woody Guthrie's younger sister, is the festival's perennial guest of honor.

The festival, which over the years has morphed into being called "WoodyFest" by attendees, was founded in 1998 and the inaugural festival included performances by Guthrie's son Arlo Guthrie, British folk-punk-rock artist Billy Bragg, Ellis Paul, Jimmy LaFave, Joel Rafael, and The Red Dirt Rangers. For the festival's founding, the Woody Guthrie Coalition commissioned a local Creek Indian sculptor to cast a full-body bronze statue of Guthrie and his guitar, complete with the guitar's well-known inscription: "This machine kills fascists". The statue, sculpted by artist Dan Brook, stands along Okemah's main street – named Broadway – in the heart of downtown Okemah.

The Woody Guthrie Coalition wanted the Guthrie family's approval before establishing the festival. Arlo Guthrie and his sister, Nora, felt strongly that their father would want the festival accessible to all and stipulated that they would sanction the festival if it were free. The Coalition complied and for 17 years the festival was free, except for a nominal parking fee. After struggling financially for several years, in 2015 the Coalition initiated an admission fee for two venues, while still providing free music at another two venues. To keep expenses at a minimum, artists donate their time, although the Woody Guthrie Coalition pays for the artists' transportation and lodging. According to Rafael, the festival is a wonderful event because musicians are motivated to participate for all the right reasons.

== Foundation laid ==
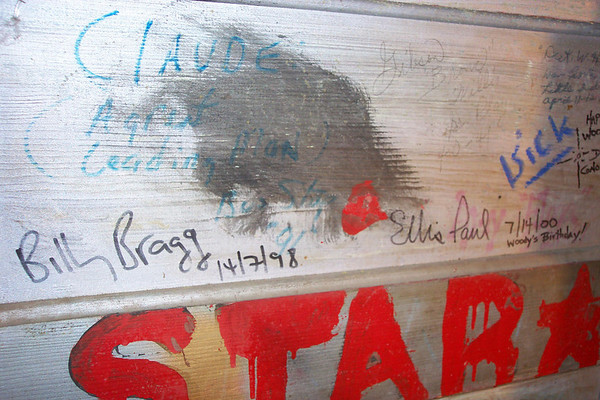
Billy Bragg signed the wall in the "green room" of the Crystal Theater on Woody's birthday in 1998; Ellis Paul on the same date in 2000.

In the early 1960s, Woody Guthrie was living on Mermaid Avenue in Coney Island, New York. Although Bob Dylan made a pilgrimage to visit Guthrie, who was physically deteriorating due to a neurological disorder called Huntington's Disease, the town of Okemah had no interest in remembering its native son. Okemah residents regarded Guthrie with some suspicion and some believed he was a Communist based on his "Woody Sez" column published in a Communist paper The People's World. In addition, Guthrie sang out his beliefs at labor union rallies – sometimes with other outspoken artists such as Pete Seeger and Cisco Houston. As late as 1971, the Okemah City Council refused to proclaim Woody Guthrie Day due to his radical politics. By the 1970s, although most young people in Okemah had never heard of Guthrie, Guthrie-followers began making pilgrimages to Okemah to visit the house where Guthrie lived. Guthrie's son Arlo – a well-known folksinger himself by the 70s – also made occasional trips to Okemah "to feel the situation out."

Twenty years after Woody Guthrie died and approximately ten years before the first festival, Minnesota musician Larry Long decided to continue in the footsteps of Woody Guthrie and become a traveling troubadour. With a grant from the Oklahoma State Department of Education and the Oklahoma Arts Council, Long moved to Okemah and began working with Okemah school students in the Oakes Elementary School and in the Okemah Middle School where he became an artist-in-residence. Over several years Long managed to garner support from local residents to have the students participate in a Woody Guthrie tribute concert.

Some residents of Okemah were strongly opposed to having any kind of tribute to Guthrie and did not think Woody Guthrie deserved any kind of recognition. Several letters to the editor were published in the Okemah News Leader giving voice to this opposition. At the same time, those who supported Long's work also wrote letters to the editor. Support came not only from local residents, but also from others across the country including Pete Seeger and Harold Leventhal.

Long stated: "Woody Guthrie changed my life when I was a kid and he's very important to me. I'm absolutely in his tradition. When I was 18 I decided I was going to travel the world and be like Woody Guthrie. Woody was a folklore hero and it would be good for main street (Okemah) if he was celebrated here."

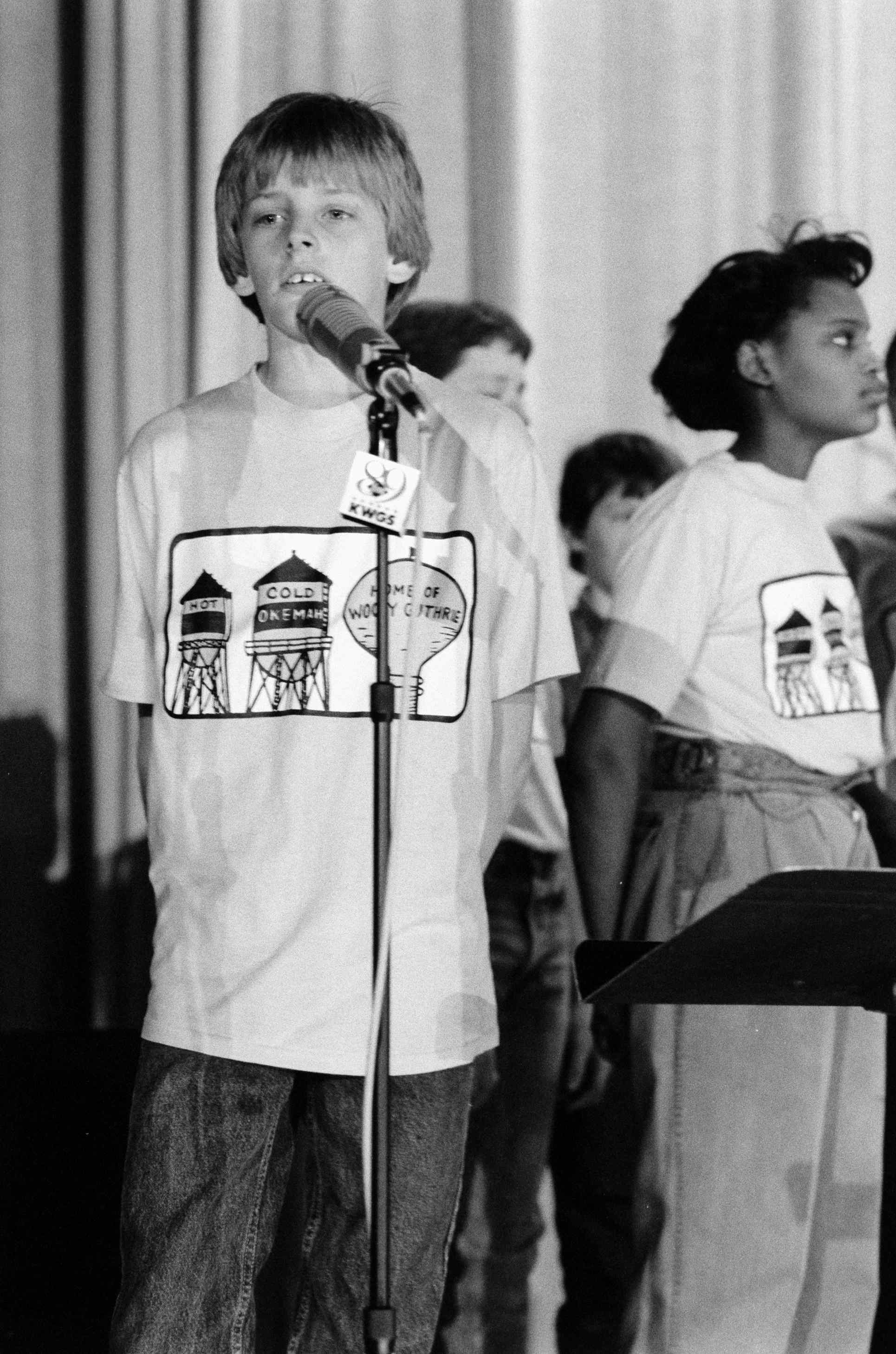
Jerry Baker and students from Okemah, Oklahoma. Dec. 1, 1988.

With the assistance of middle school principal Larry McKinney and school board president Mark Smyth, who also owned Okemah's Crystal Theatre, the first tribute to Woody Guthrie took place on December 1, 1988. Students from Okemah, Langston, and Davenport, Oklahoma performed songs they had written with Long's help. Selections from Woody's writings were narrated by Okemah 7th grader Jerry Baker and translated into the Seminole and Creek languages by First Nation Elder Woodrow ‘Wotko’ Haney. Besides Long other featured artists included Larry's long-time musical companion Fiddlin’ Pete Watercott from California and the following beloved Oklahoma musicians: banjo virtuoso Alan Munde; gospel pianist Shirley Davis; and Okemah's own Reverend Olen Edwards on vocals and harmonica. McKinney said the artist-in-resident program was a "good learning experience for his seventh grade students". Long stated that the lyrics for the songs “came from students interviewing their parents, grandparents and each other. So when it came time to hold a big community celebration for Woody, it was no longer just Woody we were celebrating, but the entire community of Okemah and Oklahoma.” Woody's sister, Mary Jo Guthrie Edgmon, attended the concert and later said: "I felt the warmth of my family all around me. Clara, Roy, Woody, George, Papa and Mama. They, too, all sat here in this very theatre many years ago. When the children came marching down the aisle and on the stage I swelled with pride and the tears came. I knew Woody was watching.”

NBC's Today Show sent correspondent Lucky Severson to Okemah to cover the event. Local residents both for and against the tribute to Woody appeared in Severson's Today Show segment.

News of the tribute concert spread to Tulsa and beyond. Headlines included "Guthrie finally gets a hometown tribute", "Okemah's children honor Woody Guthrie with song", and "Oklahoma town finally pays tribute to memory of 'Dust Bowl' balladeer".

The concert was recorded and later released as Larry Long and the Children of Oklahoma – It Takes a Lot of People (Tribute to Woody Guthrie) (Flying Fish/Rounder). The following spring the album's release was celebrated with Arlo Guthrie in concert at the Crystal Theatre. This would be Arlo's first full concert in his father's hometown. The following year (1990), the city of Okemah declared that July 14 – Woody's birthday – be an official city holiday. On that date, Long returned to Okemah and was part of a hootennany held at the Crystal Theatre. News of the city declaration spread and a headline in the Wall Street Journal read: “This is the way the Cold War ends, as a Hootenanny”.

Larry Long standing beneath the Crystal Theatre marquee. Dec. 1, 1988.

As a result of Long's work in Okemah, an organization known as W.O.O.D.Y. (Woody Guthrie Okemah Organization for Developing Youth) was born. Founding members included Okemah residents Carolyn Price, Dr. Larry and Vicki McKinney, Lois Tanner, Mark Smyth, Shari Parks, Bobby Massey, and Mike and Wilma Lambeth. The organization's goal was to hold an annual event to not only honor Woody Guthrie, but to also raise funds for the education of local youth. This organization eventually morphed into the Woody Guthrie Coalition Inc.

However, it wasn't until the late 1990s, when Billy Bragg visited Okemah filming scenes for his Man in the Sand documentary about the making of Mermaid Avenue, a collection of unknown Guthrie lyrics put to Bragg's music in collaboration with Wilco, that the town of Okemah started to fully embrace its wiry wanderlusting native. Bragg fittingly christened the first festival in 1998. In an article for Dirty Linen Annette C. Eshleman wrote: "Residents' attitudes have gone from angry accusations of Guthrie being a Communist, to suspicious tolerance, to embracing his legion of loyal fans. And while the economic boost that a festival provides to such a small community is certainly welcome, the kindness and hospitality of openhearted locals is genuine."

== 1998–2002 ==
The first annual Woody Guthrie festival was presented in part by The Orphanage Society, a non-profit charitable arts organization dedicated to supporting and presenting live, original folk music in Oklahoma. The 1998 festival included headliners Tom Paxton, Ray Wylie Hubbard, Peter Keane, Tom Skinner and Kevin Welch plus artists who would – along with Arlo Guthrie, Ellis Paul, Jimmy LaFave, Joel Rafael, and The Red Dirt Rangers – become "WoodyFest" regulars: Terry "Buffalo" Ware, Don Conoscenti and Bob Childers. The festival's program booklet includes a welcome letter from Michael M. Hagy, Mayor of Okemah, who said "The first annual Woody Guthrie festival is just the beginning of the great things to come." The festival was held over a period of three days – July 17–19, 1998, with Billy Bragg and Ellis Paul opening the festival earlier in the week with a special benefit show at the Crystal Theater on Tuesday, July 14 – Woody's birthday. Paul stated that when he made his first pilgrimage to Okemah – years before the first festival – he felt that he was walking in Woody's footsteps and that the experience was like "going to the mount". Paul also admits to being one of the many folksingers who have taken a small piece of rock from the crumbling foundation of Guthrie's house in Okemah, saying, at that time, that he kept the memento in his guitar case.

The program booklet from the second annual festival not only included a welcome letter from Mayor Hagy, but also from the governor of Oklahoma, Frank Keating, who said "Woody Guthrie left a rich legacy to future Oklahoma musicians and is certainly one of the most well known musical artists to ever hale from Oklahoma." The festival was again presented by The Orphanage Society in tandem with the Woody Guthrie Coalition. Arlo Guthrie headlined the festival along with The Kingston Trio, who would make their first and only festival appearance. Also making their first appearance were Country Joe McDonald, Slaid Cleaves, John Wesley Harding, Chuck Pyle, Peter Keane, Dave Carter and Tracy Grammer, Larry Long, and others. The festival was held July 14–18, 1999 and kicked off with a special Woody Guthrie hootenanny at the Crystal Theater on July 14 – Woody's birthday. The hootenanny featured Arlo Guthrie, The Kingston Trio, and Country Joe McDonald. Ellis Paul served as emcee.

The third annual festival was held July 12–16, 2000. The festival's official program booklet included a letter signed by Nora Guthrie, Woody's daughter, and other staff members of the Woody Guthrie Foundation and Archives in New York City, where Nora is Director. The letter stated "We want to thank all our family and friends in Okemah who have worked so hard over the past few years to organize this great celebration." The festival kicked off with a special benefit concert at the Crystal Theater with Jackson Browne playing a solo acoustic show. First-timers in 2000 were Pete Seeger (with his grandson Tao Rodriguez-Seeger), Chuck Brodsky, Darci Deaville, Erica Wheeler, Michael Fracasso, Susan Shore, Mary Reynolds, and others. In addition to the main stage performances, after-hours all-star jams were held at the Brick Street Cafe and at the Rocky Road Tavern. The festival ended with a hootenanny on Sunday to benefit the Oklahoma Chapter of the Huntington's Disease Society.

Luna Burnett, Mayor of Okemah in 2001 welcomed attendees of the fourth WoodyFest by saying "I have personally seen the impact Woody Guthrie's style and words of song has made on each and every artist who has appeared through their own expressions of song as they perform during the festival." The festival kicked off on Wednesday, July 11 with a "Tribute to Woody Guthrie" fundraiser at the Crystal Theater. The concert was performed with the original script used Jan. 20, 1968 at Carnegie Hall in New York City. The show was introduced by Guy Logsdon and narrated by Bill McCloud. First-time performers at the fourth festival, held July 11–15 were Lucy Kaplansky, Xavier, (Abe Guthrie's band), Vance Gilbert, Bill Miller, Pierce Pettis, and others. A children's festival was held for the first time on Friday and Saturday, and the festival ended on Sunday with a gospel worship service led by Olen Edwards and the Okemah Community Choir joined by other guest performers.

The fifth annual festival began with a Wednesday night benefit concert by performer Steve Young. First-time performers in 2002 included Irene Kelley, Johnsmith, Kat Eggleston, Bill Chambers, Tom Prasado-Rao, and Caroline Herring. Open mics were held at Lou's Rocky Road Tavern and a children's festival was once again held at the Okemah City Park. The festival ended with a Tribute to Woody Guthrie held on Sunday at the Crystal Theater. The tribute was narrated by Dr. Guy Logsdon, internationally recognized authority on the life, times, and music of Woody Guthrie, interspersed with Guthrie songs performed by festival performers.

== 2003–2007 ==
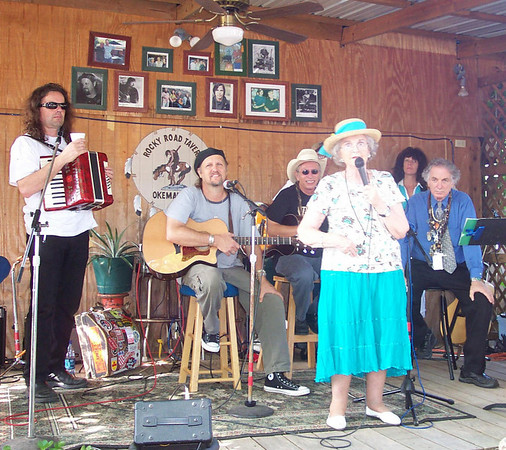
Mary Jo Guthrie Edgmon speaking at her "pancake breakfast" while (L-R) Radoslav Lorković, Jimmy LaFave, Joel Rafael, Marie Burns and David Amram look on. July 15, 2006.

The Woody Guthrie Coalition welcomed festival attendees to the sixth annual festival in 2003 by saying "We are honored to have back with us Arlo Guthrie & Family along with an American icon, Pete Seeger, and, for the first time, another great folk music legend, Josh White, Jr.". Guthrie family members in attendance included Arlo's daughters Sarah Lee Guthrie (and husband Johnny Irion), Cathy Guthrie, and Annie Guthrie, and his son Abe. In addition, other first-time festival performers included Ramblin' Jack Elliot, Eliza Gilkyson, Ronny Elliot, Carrie Newcomer, Steppin' In It, Blackfire, Christopher Williams and The Burns Sisters. The festival kicked off with a ticketed event at the Crystal Theater on Wednesday night titled "Welcome Home Woody – An Oklahoma Tribute to Woody Guthrie". The benefit show featured many of the 2003 festival performers. The festival ended on Sunday with a "Hoot for Huntington's" featuring many festival performers donating their time to raise money for the Huntington's Disease Society. Another fundraiser – held for the first time in 2003 – was "Mary Jo's Pancake Breakfast". The breakfast – another event to raise money for the Huntington's Disease Society – provides Woody Guthrie's youngest sister, Mary Jo, an opportunity to share memories and tell stories about her big brother Woody. The first pancake breakfast, which has continued to be held annually, was held in the Okfusgee Historical Society, but subsequent pancake breakfasts were held on the outdoor patio at Lou's Rocky Road Tavern. A variety of artists – including regulars Jimmy LaFave and Joel Rafael – perform Woody Guthrie songs interspersed with Mary Jo's storytelling.

Steve Earle headlined the 7th annual festival held July 14–18, 2004. It was Earle's festival debut. The festival opened on July 14 – Woody's birthday – with a tribute concert called "Happy Birthday, Woody". Other artists who made their festival debut in 2004 were Kris Delmhorst, John Flynn, Karen Mal, Rob McNurlin and David Wilcox. The festival concluded on Sunday with another "Hoot for Huntington's" – an all-star jam at the Crystal Theater.

David Amram, first met Woody Guthrie in 1956. In his report of the 2005 WoodyFest he remembers that meeting: "Ever since that day we first met, I have always hoped that someday I would get the chance to go to Okemah, but with my crazy schedule I never had the opportunity to do so. When I was invited to the festival, I realized that I would be finally be able to see his hometown, and be able to meet his sister, her husband and his remaining old friends from long ago who were still living there. By doing that, and by playing music and spending time with people who were also natives of Okemah, I knew that I would be able to understand Woody and his work in a deeper way." It took Amram 49 years, but in 2005 his life journey finally brought him to Okemah where he, along with his son Adam, headlined the eighth annual festival. Other first-time performers included Peter Yarrow, John Fullbright, and Kevin So.

The ninth annual festival was held July 12–16, 2006. Randy Norman, President of the Woody Guthrie Coalition, wrote: "The first few years were an experiment that continues nine years later. We were very lucky to find a core group of outstanding artists that first year who believed as we did and were willing to help make the first festival a success, if not fiscally at least in the spirit of Woody." First-time festival performers included Ronny Cox, Sam Baker, Joe Ely, Greg Klyma, and others. The festival kicked off on Wednesday when Arlo Guthrie and family brought their "Alice's Restaurant Massacree" tour to town. Jimmy LaFave closed out the festival on Saturday night at the Pastures of Plenty. Other highlights of the 2006 festival included a poetry and spoken-word tribute to Woody Guthrie featuring prominent Oklahoma poets as well as "Strokes of Electriciy: The Artwork of Woody Guthrie" presented by Steven Brower. The festival concluded on Sunday with another "Hoot for Huntington's" – an all-star jam at the Crystal Theater.

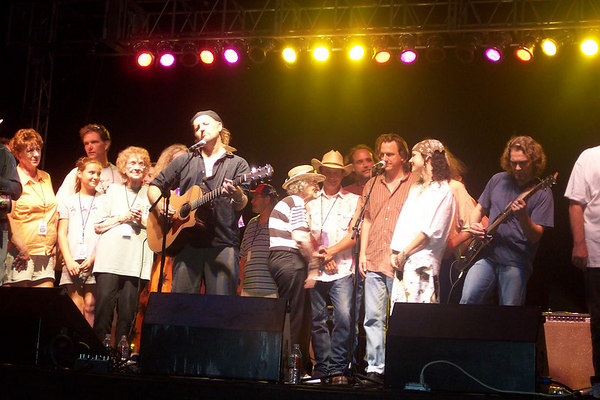
Jimmy LaFave on stage for the 2006 grand finale with members of the Guthrie family and other artists. July 14, 2006.

The 10th annual festival took place July 11–15, 2007. To celebrate the ten-year anniversary, one of many Oklahoma centennial-year events, the festival kicked off with a ticketed event on Wednesday night in Okemah's historic Crystal Theater. Seven "10-year artists" – artists who have participated every year since the festival's inception – performed at a Coalition benefit show titled "In the Spirit of Woody Guthrie". Those artists were Jimmy LaFave, Don Conoscenti, Ellis Paul, Bob Childers, Joel Rafael, Terry "Buffalo" Ware, and the Red Dirt Rangers. The 2007 lineup spanning over four days included more than 60 artists from many genres including folk, alt-country and rock. Members of the Guthrie family scheduled to appear were Arlo Guthrie and Cathy Guthrie (daughter of Arlo) and Amy Nelson (daughter of Willie Nelson), who perform as Folk Uke. More than 100 artists performed at the festival's 10-year celebration including Kevin Welch, Sara Hickman, Butch Hancock, Tim O'Brien, Ronny Elliot, Terri Hendrix and Lloyd Maines, Rob McNurlin, Jack Williams, Antje Duvekot, Johnsmith, Sam Baker, David and Adam Amram, The Burns Sisters, Ronny Cox, Michael Fracasso, Radoslav Lorković and Eliza Gilkyson. The tenth festival again concluded on Sunday with a "Hoot for Huntington's", having become a Woody Fest tradition. The hootenanny is coordinated and led by Terry "Buffalo" Ware, a guitarist living in Norman, Oklahoma, and the Woody Guthrie Folk Festival All-Star House Band. The House Band also includes Randy Crouch (fiddle/pedal steel), Don Morris (bass), Dean Brown (drums), Dan Duggin (accordion) and T.Z. Wright (keyboard/accordion). The House Band can be heard playing back-up for many festival performers and in 2007 also played a set of their own – as The Oklahoma Geniuses – at the Brick Street Cafe.

== 2008 ==
In April 2008 festival regular Bob Childers died unexpectedly at home. As a result, a special pre-festival Childers tribute show was held at Cain's Ballroom in Tulsa on July 8, 2008, the evening before the official start of the festival. Performers at the tribute included Jimmy LaFave, The Burns Sisters, The Red Dirt Rangers, Mike McClure, Joel Rafael, Stoney LaRue and Tom Skinner. In addition, the festival program booklet included a special Bob Childers Memorial Page, and quotes made by his songwriting friends were interspersed as tributes throughout.

The following night Country Joe McDonald's Tribute to Woody Guthrie at the Crystal Theater opened the 11th annual festival held July 9–13. It was McDonald's second appearance at the festival, having performed at the 2nd annual festival in 1999.

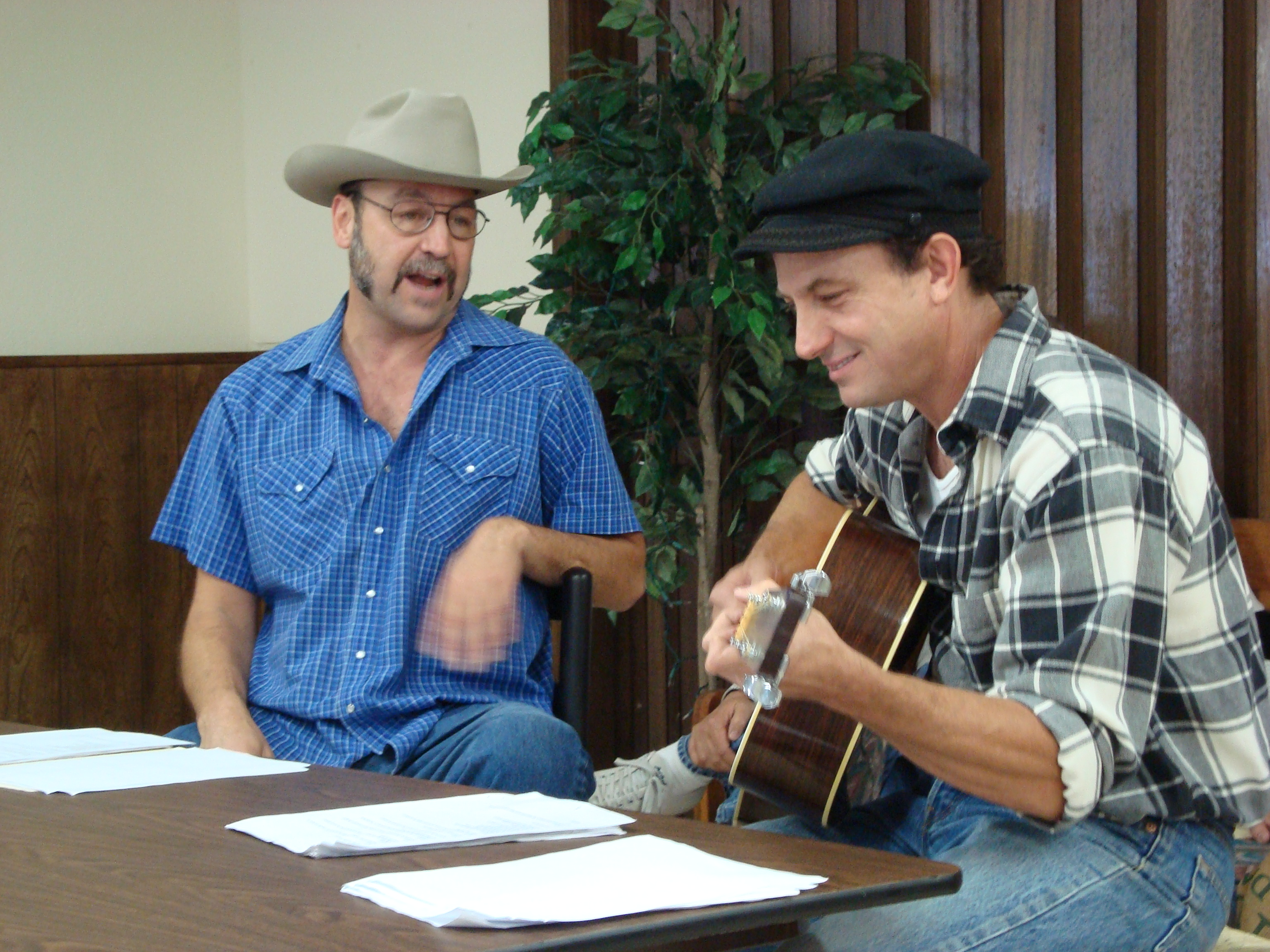
John Cooper and Brad Piccolo read the parts of Bob Wills and Woody Guthrie. July 11, 2008.

Highlights of the 5-day festival included debut performances by Judy Collins, who closed the festival on Saturday night, John Gorka, Jon Vezner and Jimmy Davis. In addition, a special edition of the Phil Ochs Song Night was held, emceed by Ochs' sister, Sonny Ochs. Performers at the Ochs' tribute included Gorka, John Flynn, Sean Flynn, Jimmy LaFave, David Amram, Sara Hickman, and Radoslav Lorković. Several young singer-songwriters also made their festival debut. They included Alexinder Gunn, Anthony da Costa, Ali Harter and Amy Speace. Other highlights included the premier of a table reading of "Time Changes Everything," a one-act play written by John Wooley and Thomas Conner that features two characters: Woody Guthrie and Bob Wills. Although there is no evidence that these two famous songwriters ever met, the play considers the possibility by chronicling two conversations between the men. The starring roles were read by two of the Red Dirt Rangers: John Cooper as Wills and Brad Piccolo as Guthrie. Several musicians participated in the festival's annual Community Outreach Program. Among those who volunteered their time and talents were Nancy Apple, who performed at the Okemah Senior Citizens Center, and Ronny Elliott, who performed at the Okemah Senior Citizens Center.

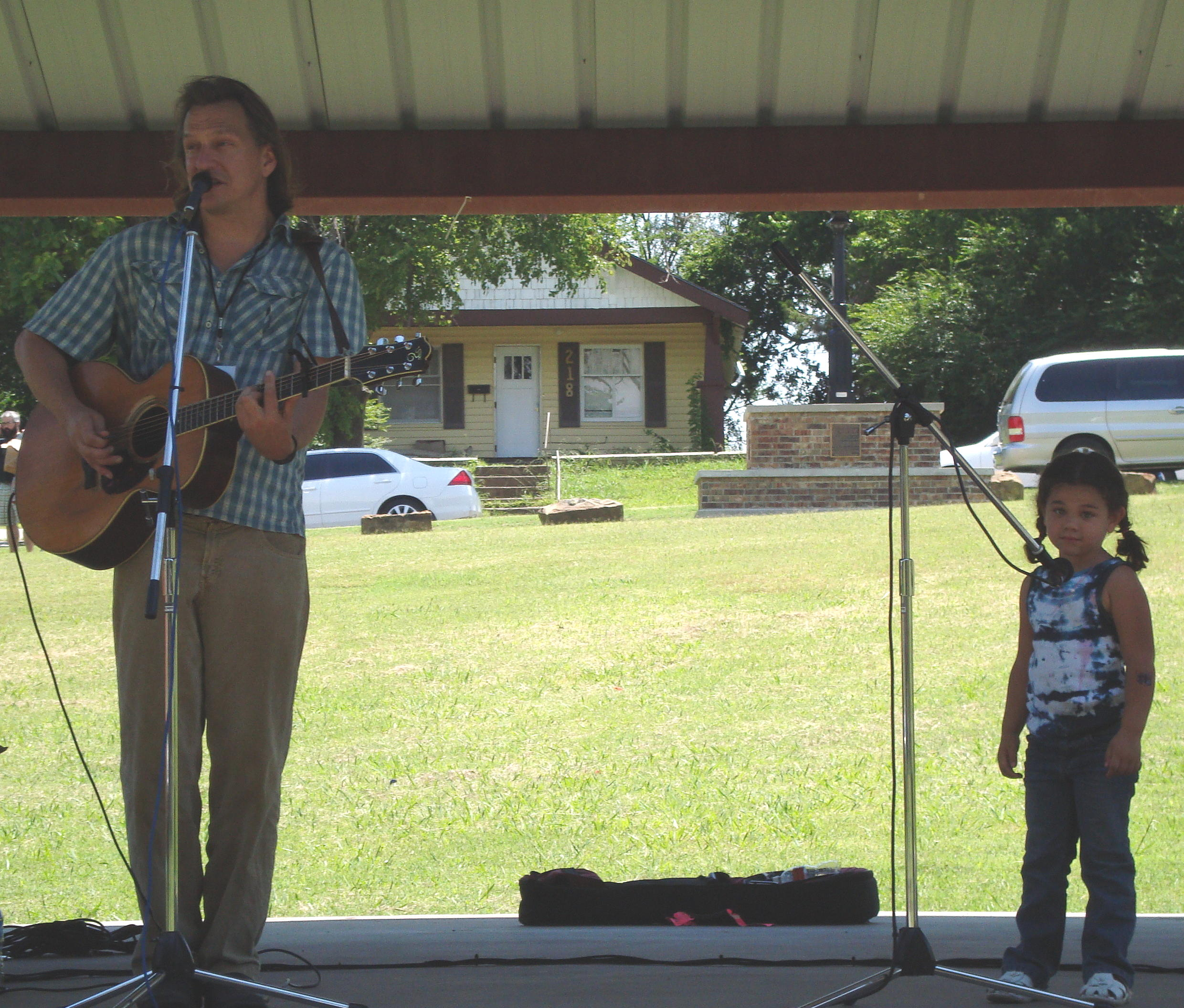
Ellis Paul and young fan at the Children's Festival. July 12, 2008.

Several musicians performed at the Children's Festival, including Nancy Apple, Sara Hickman, and the Red Dirt Rangers. Also performing was Ellis Paul, who performed songs from his 2008 award-winning children's CD Dragonfly Races. Other activities for children at the Children's Festival included surrey rides, harmonica lessons, face painting, clowns, and crafts. The Children's Festival is held in the Okemah City Park and is made possible with a grant from the Viersen Family Foundation.

The 2008 festival ended on Sunday, July 13 with the traditional Sunday "Hoot for Huntington's". Randy Norman, President of the Woody Guthrie Coalition, stated that the crowd for the Sunday hootenanny was the largest he had seen. Although in the past the hootenanny closed with Bob Childers performing "Woody's Road," in Childers' absence the WoodyFest House Band and a multitude of performers gathered on stage to perform the Childers-penned song with the audience singing along. A video of this performance has been posted on the YouTube website.

== 2009 ==
The 12th annual festival began with a special Wanda Jackson pre-festival benefit show held at Cain's Ballroom in Tulsa on July 7, 2009. In an e-mail interview before the show Jackson said, "There is no other artist who has influenced the music world any more than Woody Guthrie. He certainly has my respect and admiration for his contributions." Openers for the show were Nancy Apple and Ronny Elliott.

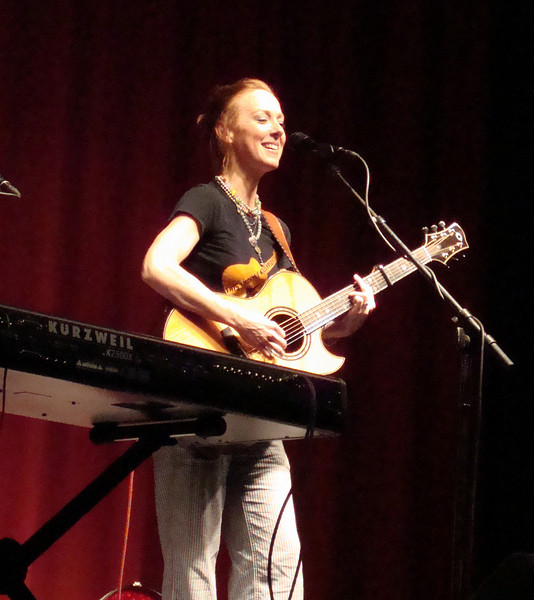
Jonatha Brooke performing in the Crystal Theater during the Woody Guthrie Folk Festival. July 8, 2009.

The festival's official kick-off took place the following night, July 8, 2009, at the Crystal Theater in Okemah. The concert, a benefit for the Woody Guthrie Coalition, featured SONiA and Jonatha Brooke. Brooke is the most recent songwriter – and the first female – to release an album of formerly unrecorded Guthrie lyrics put to her own music. The album is titled The Works. A few days after her first visit to Okemah, Brooke wrote in her blog:

All I can say is, there was a LOT of love in this room on Wednesday night. The Woody Guthrie Folk Festival draws some of the most generous, lovelyest, singingest, kindest, wonderfulest people EVER. (i think that's how Woody would have said it. ;)

The first full-day of the festival included the second annual Bob Childers memorial set at the Brick Street Cafe with a variety of musicians led by Jimmy LaFave paying tribute to Childers. That evening, Stoney LaRue made his festival debut by closing out the Thursday night line-up. The popular red dirt musician, now living in Edmond, Oklahoma, said that playing WoodyFest was like "pumice to his soul".

Other musical highlights included Crystal Theater debut performances by Mark Erelli and Andrea Parodi. A few days before his festival performance, Erelli wrote:

It's a real honor to be a part of this festival in honor of Woody Guthrie. Singer/songwriters often joke that they wouldn't have a job if it hadn't been for Bob Dylan. But Dylan wouldn't have had a job if not for Woody. I can't wait to pay my respects."

Performers at this year's Children's Festival included the Red Dirt Rangers, Ellis Paul, and Sarah Lee Guthrie & Johnny Irion.

Non-musical highlights included lectures by representatives of the Woody Guthrie Foundation and Archive. Tiffany Colannino, chief archivist, and Anna Canoni, Guthrie's granddaughter, offered multimedia presentations on Guthrie's legacy. The 12th annual festival also marked the fifth appearance of the Woody Guthrie Poets under the direction of Carol Hamilton and George Wallace.

New for 2009 were songwriting workshops – one conducted by Jack Hardy, and a second conducted by Sam Baker and Ronny Elliott. The workshops were held at Lou's Rocky Road Tavern, the venue that also hosted daily open mics.

Guthrie's younger sister, Mary Jo Guthrie Edgmon, hosted her annual pancake breakfast benefiting the Huntington's Disease Society of America on Saturday, July 11 at Lou's Rocky Road Tavern. Guthrie died of complications from Huntington's in 1967, at the age of 55.

The 2009 festival ended on Sunday, July 12 with the traditional Sunday "Hoot for Huntington's". Once again, in the absence of Bob Childers, the WoodyFest House Band and a variety of musicians gathered on stage to close the festival by singing Childers' "Woody's Road" with bassist, Don Morris, singing lead vocals.

After traveling from England in 2009 to attend the festival for the third consecutive year, Jela Webb wrote: "Like many others before me, having experienced it once, it took hold of my soul and I just want to keep returning year after year. There is a sense of spirituality that I cannot easily describe in words about WoodyFest, the people and the wonderful camaraderie created through the performances and shared devotion to Guthrie's legacy."

== 2010 ==
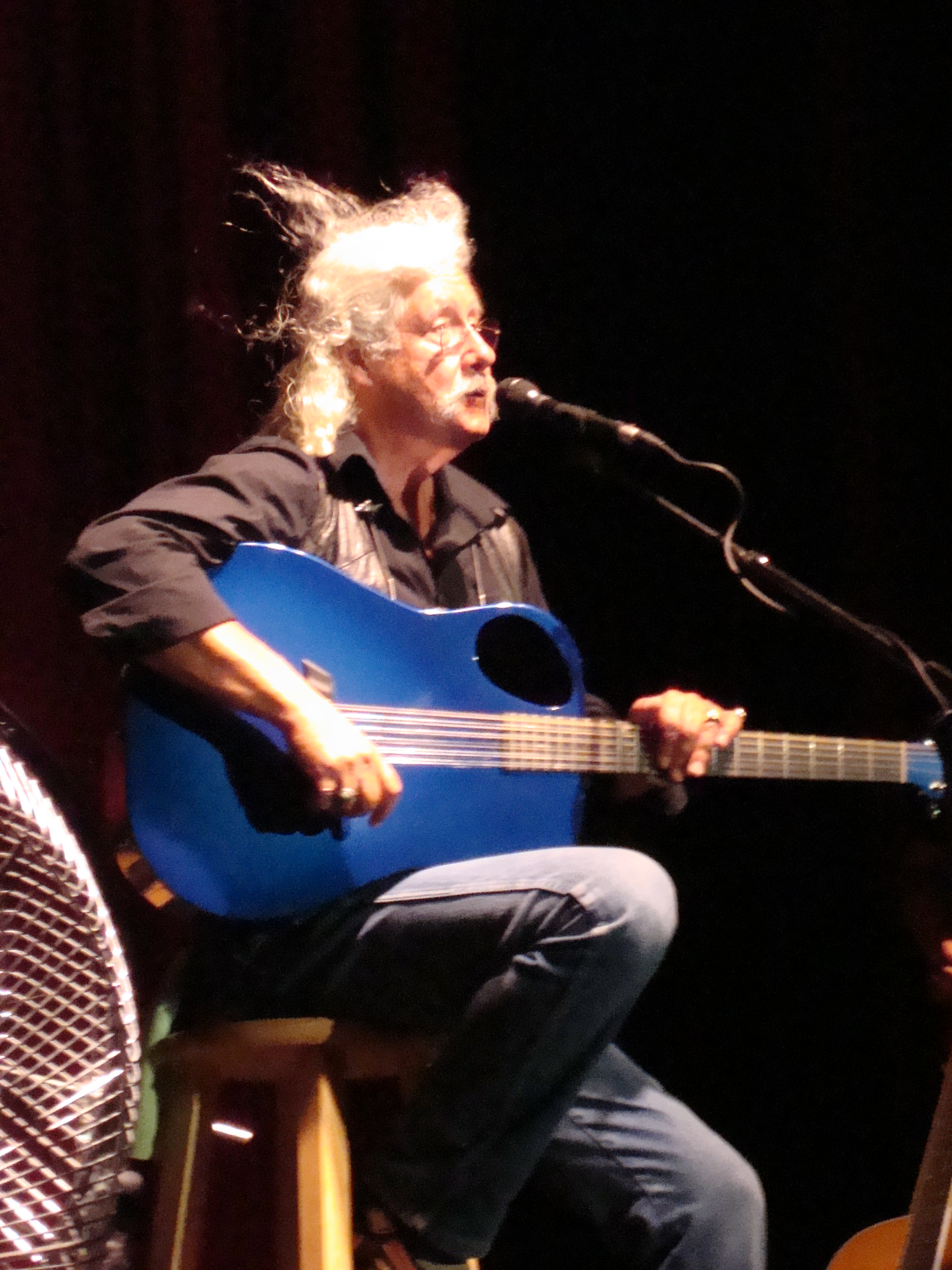
Arlo Guthrie performing in the Crystal Theater. July 14, 2010.

Arlo Guthrie opened the 13th Annual Festival with a performance at the Crystal Theater on July 14, 2010 – his father's 98th birthday. He was accompanied on stage by his son Abe Guthrie, grandsons Krishna Guthrie and Mo Guthrie and band member Terry Hall. Ramsay Midwood also performed an opening set. Musicians making their festival debut included Red Molly, John Wort Hannam, Jess Klein, and Stonehoney.

Pastures of Plenty headliners included Stoney LaRue (Thursday), Ellis Paul (Friday), and Jimmy LaFave (Saturday). Other performers included Lauren Lee, Susan Herndon, Travis Linville, Broken Wing Routine, Monica Taylor, Butch Morgan, the Red Dirt Rangers, Nancy Apple, SONiA, David Amram, the Burns Sisters, Betty Soo, Randy Weeks, Emily Kaitz, Happenstance, Randy Crouch, Jonathan Byrd, Audrey Auld, Ronny Elliott, Don Conoscenti, John Fullbright, Butch Hancock, Terri Hendrix with Lloyd Maines, Rob McNurlin, Radoslav Lorković, Dao Strom, Mary Reynolds, Annie Guthrie, David Jacobs-Strain, Rachael Davis, Sam Baker, Steppin' In It, and Joel Rafael.

New for 2010 was a guitar workshop conducted by Terry "Buffalo" Ware and John Inmon.

Performers at this year's Children's Festival included Nancy Apple, the Red Dirt Rangers, Butch Morgan, Ellis Paul, and Terry Hall.

The Woody Guthrie Foundation and Archive presented "My Name is New York: Exploring Woody Guthrie's New York City" presented by archivist Tiffany Colannino and "Bound for Glory: The Legacy of Woody Guthrie" presented by Anna Canoni, Nora Guthrie's daughter. "My Name is New York" – the newest program from the Archive – explores the lofts, apartments and couches where Guthrie lived and wrote some of his most well-loved songs. "Bound for Glory" is partly a documentary by the same name that was specially created for the "This Land is Your Land: The Life and Legacy of Woody Guthrie" exhibit that toured the country from 1998–2001. Barry Ollman, member of the Advisory Board of the Foundation, presented "Collecting Woody Take IV" describing his 20-year hunt for the letters and drawings of Woody Guthrie.

The Woody Guthrie Coalition is one of several Okemah community organizations that has pledged to help restore the Crystal Theater. In May 2010, the Crystal Theater was purchased by Okemah's Community Improvement Association. Financing to purchase the theater included funds to quickly make needed repairs so that the theater could once again be utilized for the annual festival. In addition, the CIA immediately initiated a Save the Crystal Campaign to help with the cost of totally renovating the 100-year-old building.

== 2011 ==
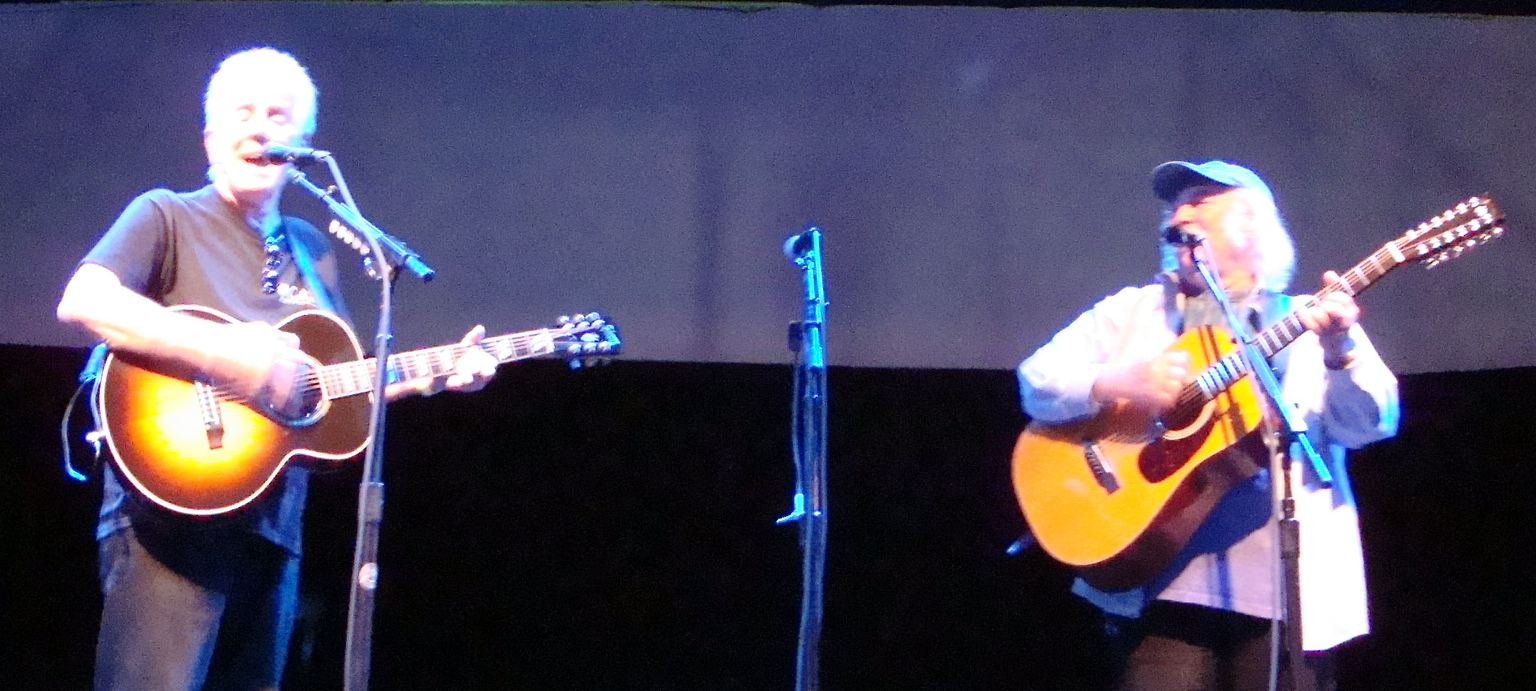
Graham Nash and David Crosby during soundcheck at Cain's Ballroom to open the Woody Guthrie Folk Festival. July 13, 2011.

The 14th annual festival kicked off on July 13, 2011, with an acoustic concert by David Crosby and Graham Nash at Cain's Ballroom in Tulsa. They were accompanied by Crosby's son, James, on piano. When interviewed a few days before the concert and asked if Woody Guthrie was an artist who had influenced him, Crosby answered: "Absolutely. Guys like Woody, Pete Seeger and Josh White all exposed me to the folk tradition early on. In fact, in my house growing up my parents only played classical and folk music, and that sort of exposure definitely made an impact."

The festival continued over the next four days in Guthrie's hometown of Okemah. Due to the ongoing renovation of Okemah's Crystal Theater, some of the daytime performances were relocated this year to the Okemah Middle School Auditorium. Artists making their WoodyFest debut in 2011 included Shawn Mullins and Gretchen Peters – both performing on the Pastures of Plenty stage. Also making her festival debut – on the relocated Crystal Theater stage – was Jude Johnstone, a songwriter who has been covered by Bonnie Raitt, Trisha Yearwood, and Johnny Cash. Johnstone was backed by Jimmy LaFave's band.

2011 marked the first time that a great-grandchild of Woody Guthrie performed a solo set when Krishna Guthrie (Arlo Guthrie's grandson; Abe Guthrie's son) took the stage at the Brick Street Cafe on Thursday afternoon on his great-grandfather's 99th birthday. Krishna Guthrie has been attending the festival since he was ten or twelve years old and says, "Every time I come here it's like a history lesson." A familial theme seemed to carry through the festival with Butch Hancock being joined on stage by his 13-year-old son, Rory, and Kevin Welch performing in tandem with his son, Dustin.

David Amram made his eighth festival appearance, but the first one without his son, Adam, who had a scheduling conflict that prevented him from attending. Amram can be found playing a variety of musical instruments with numerous artists during their sets in addition to performing his own solo set. He says, "I just love the whole festival so much," Amram said. "It's four days of great music, great people, great fellowship, no sleep and an unforgettable time." It was his experiences in Okemah that inspired Amram to compose Symphonic Variations on a Song by Woody Guthrie in 2007. On Thursday, Amram participated in a one-hour interview and performance for the radio show Art of the Song. The radio show – hosted by John Dillon and Vivian Nesbitt – provides a forum for artists to discuss creativity and their individual creative process. The following day, Ronny Cox was the radio show's guest interviewee.

Jimmy LaFave once again closed out the Saturday night line-up, ending with Guthrie's now-traditional "This Land is Your Land" and stating "see you next year for Woody's 100th birthday". The two-hour-long Sunday afternoon "Hoot for Huntington's", under the direction of Terry "Buffalo" Ware and the WoodyFest House Band, squeezed in 23 musicians each performing one song – the traditional last song being Bob Childers' "Woody's Road".

== 2012: The Centennial Celebration ==
During a "Woody100" celebration concert held at the Brady Theater in Tulsa on March 10, 2012, Robert Santelli, Director of the Grammy Museum, presented a plaque to Mary Jo Guthrie Edgmon and a representative of the Woody Guthrie Coalition. Santelli read the inscription which honors the city of Okemah and the Woody Guthrie Folk Festival for their tremendous efforts in preserving the music of Woody Guthrie.

The 15th annual festival – commemorating what would have been Woody Guthrie's 100th birthday on Saturday, July 14, 2012 – kicked off with a concert by Arlo Guthrie on July 11, 2012, in the newly renovated Crystal Theater. Gretchen Peters was the opener. Other performers during the course of the 5-day festival included Billy Bragg, Jimmy LaFave, Judy Collins, Joel Rafael, Don Conoscenti, Michael Fracasso, Ellis Paul, The Red Dirt Rangers, John Fullbright, Johnsmith, David Amram, Sam Baker, Butch Hancock, Bill Chambers, Radoslav Lorkovic, and others.

Artists making their WoodyFest debut in 2012 included Melanie, John McCutcheon, and Carolyn Hester. Local musician, John Fullbright, who first performed at the festival while still a student at Okemah High School, made his first appearance on the Pastures of Plenty main stage. "People who hadn't heard Fullbright previously were stopped in their tracks by the brilliance of this 24 year old whose mature lyrics have an immediate impact."

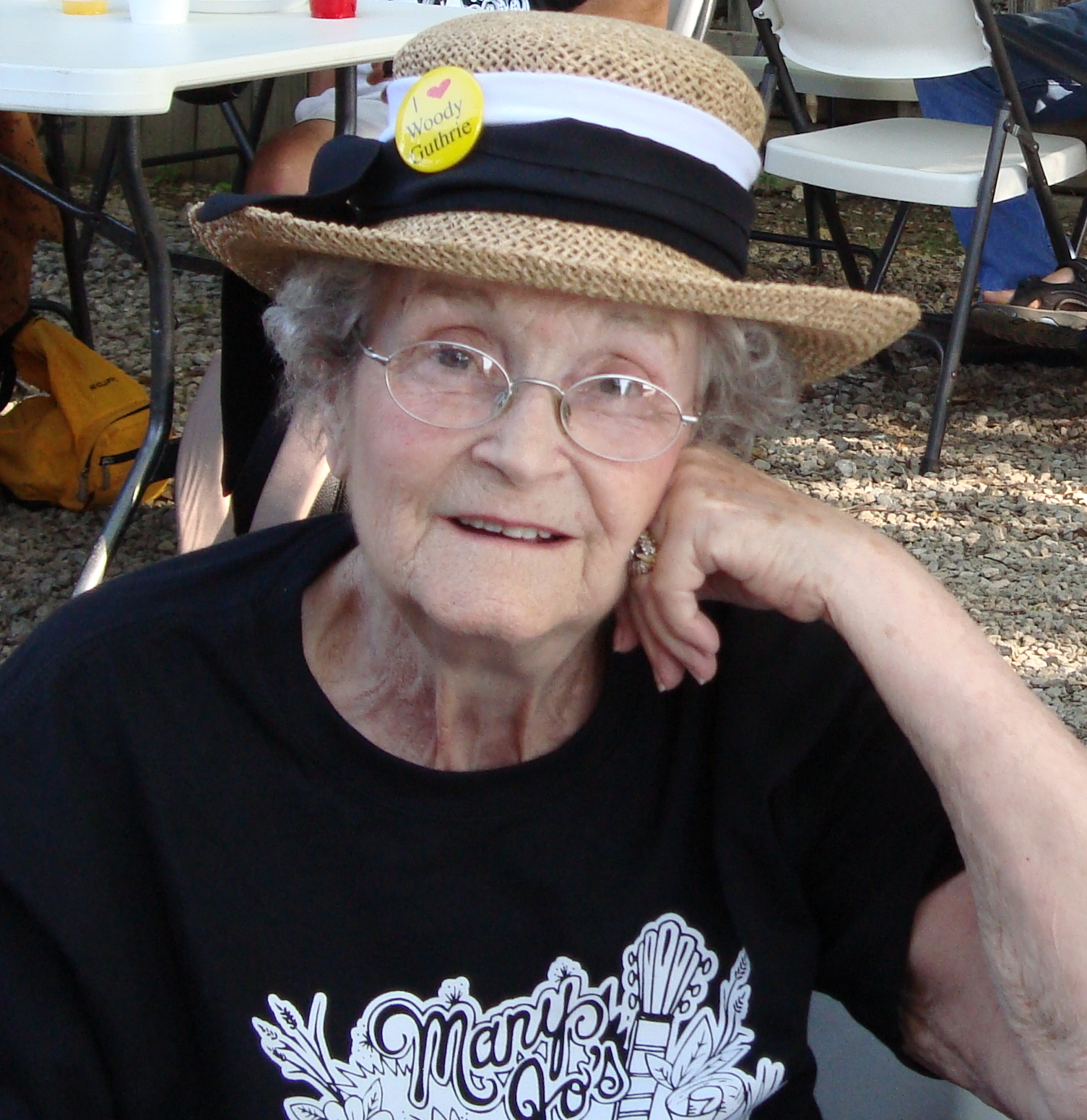
Woody Guthrie's sister, Mary Jo Guthrie Edgmon, at her annual "Pancake Breakfast". July 12, 2008.

A non-musical highlight of the centennial celebration included a book-signing event by Woody Guthrie's sister, Mary Jo Guthrie Edgmon who published her new book "Woody's Road: Woody Guthrie's Letters Home, Drawings, Photos and Other Unburied Treasures" earlier in the month. Musician David Amram – who wrote the foreword to the book – was on hand for the book signing, along with co-author and Woody Guthrie historian, Guy Logsdon. At her annual pancake breakfast on Saturday morning, 89-year-old Edgmon said "My voice is not so good anymore. I'm talking through brand-new false teeth. But I applaud the people who came here to swelter, just for this little Okie."

After an absence of 13 years, Billy Bragg returned to Okemah as the Thursday night headliner. "The protest folk singer, who headlined on Thursday, took the (outdoor) main stage, strapped his Telecaster guitar around his neck and proceeded to capture the essence of Guthrie as he sang songs from the Mermaid Avenue sessions."

Jimmy LaFave closed out Friday night by finishing his set with Woody Guthrie's "Oklahoma Hills" and "This Land is Your Land".

The festival finale was given over to the ageless Judy Collins. Known as an interpretive singer, her voice is still clear and beautiful. She told stories about times in New York, meeting a young Arlo Guthrie, being with Bob Dylan when he wrote "Mr. Tambourine Man" and sang snippets of songs, without accompaniment, by way of illustration – her clear soprano ringing out across the Pastures of Plenty. Accompanied by her pianist, she entranced the audience with, amongst others, the Grammy winning "Both Sides Now", Joan Baez's "Diamonds and Rust" and took to the piano herself for a moving song about her late mother "In The Twilight". Collins returned for one encore "Somewhere Over The Rainbow" – a fitting end to the centenary celebrations.

The artwork for this year's festival was specially created by Woody Fest regular and Advisory Board member, Ellis Paul. The original of Paul's artwork was auctioned on eBay as a fundraiser for the Woody Guthrie Coalition.

== 2013 ==
The 16th annual festival took place July 10–14, 2013. A pre-festival benefit show for the Woody Guthrie Coalition took place the day before the festival's official start at Cain's Ballroom in Tulsa and featured Todd Snider. Snider said: "Without debate, he [Woody Guthrie] created the job that I do, actually created it, the same way that somebody might create a job of being a cook." Earlier that afternoon, other festival preview performances took place at the Woody Guthrie Center which opened in Tulsa earlier in 2013. Musicians who performed were Annie Guthrie (Woody's granddaughter), Audrey Auld, and Ronny Cox.

The following evening, Jimmy LaFave and friends officially opened the 2013 festival with Walking Woody's Road at the Crystal Theater in Okemah. The musical and spoken-word event, produced by LaFave, included performances by Sam Baker, The Red Dirt Rangers, Audrey Auld, The Burns Sisters, Ronny Elliot, David Amram, Ronny Cox, Annie Guthrie, Butch Hancock, Radoslav Lorkovic, and Joel Rafael. The band for the evening included Glenn Schuetz (bass), Bobby Kallus (drums), Terry "Buffalo" Ware (guitar/mandolin), and Lorkovic (piano/accordion). LaFave, Cox, and several others provided narration consisting of excerpts from Woody's writings.

Over the next three days, more than 50 musical performances took place including festival regulars Jimmy LaFave, Joel Rafael, Ellis Paul, Don Conoscenti, and The Red Dirt Rangers. Other returning performers included David Amram, Ronny Elliott, Butch Hancock, Vance Gilbert, Susan Herndon, The Burns Sisters, Samantha Crain, Monica Taylor, John Flynn, Audrey Auld, Annie Guthrie, Greg Jacobs, Butch Morgan, Rob McNurlin, Nancy Apple, Ramsay Midwood, Randy Crouch, Happenstance, and others. Every year since Bob Childers' death in 2008, a tribute to Childers takes place as the final afternoon set at the Brick Street Café – the time when Childers would typically perform. In 2013 Monica Taylor hosted the set.

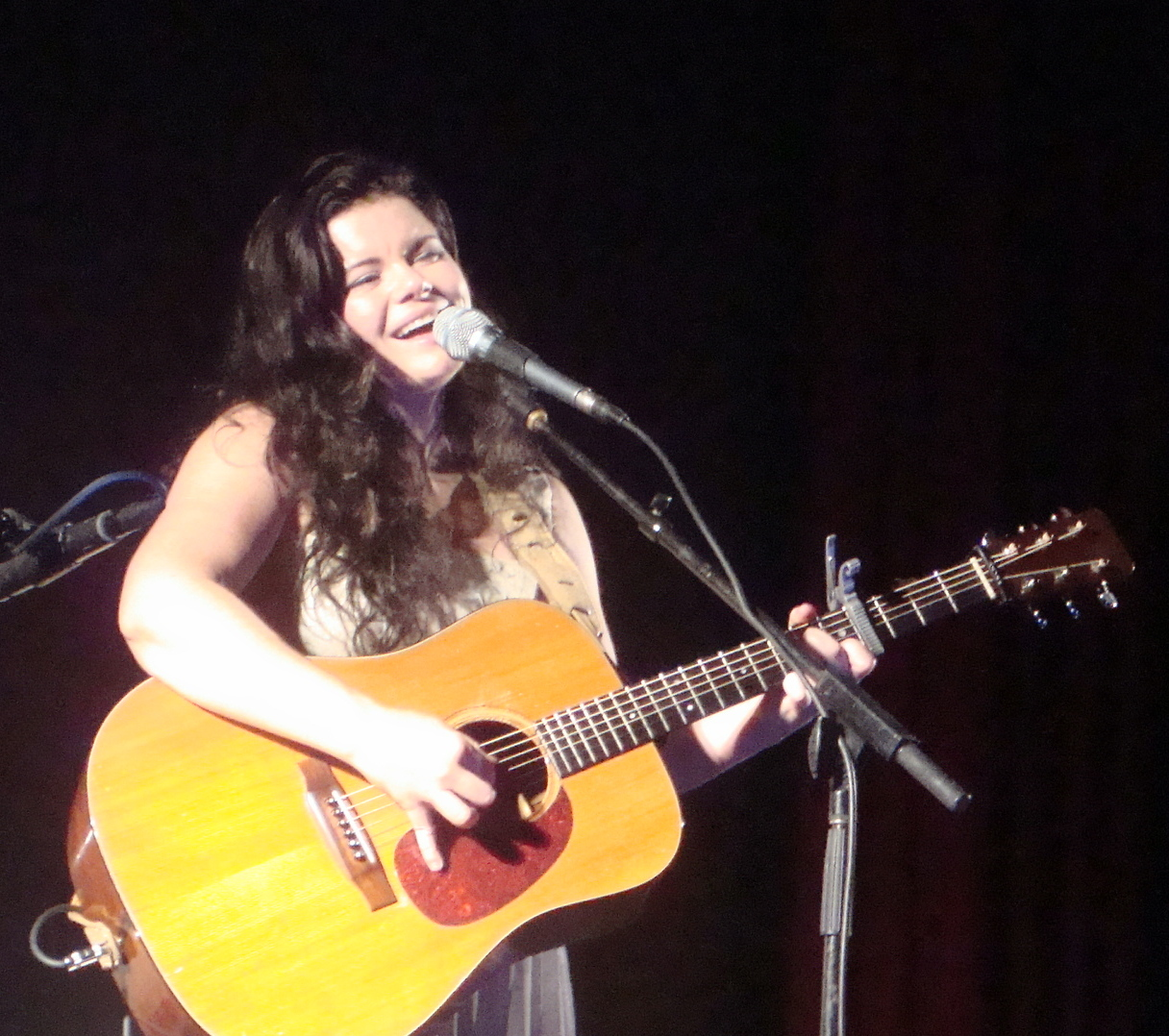
Rebecca Loebe making her festival debut at the Pastures of Plenty. July 12, 2013.

The 2013 festival included several musicians making their festival debut. Debut artists included Garrett Lebeau, folkrock duo Trout Fishing in America, Steve Poltz, Rebecca Loebe, Griffin House, Tim Easton, Otis Gibbs, young Oklahomans Parker Millsap and Levi Parham, and others. Lebeau said: "To me, Woody Guthrie is this person who wanted to write about things from people's perspective ... just normal people. And that's who I write tunes for." Ezra Idlet, one-half of the duo Trout Fishing in America said: "Two years ago, I had the time off and I just went (to WoodyFest)....just went and watched — and I was knocked out by the caliber of performers, the camaraderie between the musicians and the presenters."

Butch Hancock closed out the Thursday night festival at the Pastures of Plenty. Grammy nominee and Okemah-area native, John Fullbright was the Friday night headliner, and Jimmy LaFave once again provided the grand finale performance on Saturday night.

Other non-musical events included the Woody Guthrie Poets, book discussions, documentary screenings, Native American storytelling and more. In addition, a silent auction of Ellis Paul's original artwork created for this year's festival took place during the festival, with proceeds donated to the Coalition.

On Saturday, Mary Jo Guthrie Edgmon once again hosted her "pancake breakfast" which raises money for the Oklahoma Chapter of the Huntington's Disease Society of America. The festival ended on Sunday afternoon with the "Hoot for Huntington's" with various performers backed by the Oklahoma Geniuses under the direction of Terry "Buffalo" Ware. Don Morris, bass player with the Geniuses, led the traditional final song: Bob Childers' "Walking Woody's Road".

== 2014 ==
A Pete Seeger Sing-A-Long opened the 17th annual festival which took place July 9–13, 2014. The Wednesday night opening show included performances by Jimmy LaFave, Joel Rafael, Ronny Cox, Annie and Cathy Guthrie, David Amram, Larry Long, Audry Auld, the Red Dirt Rangers, Radoslav Lorkovic, Tim Easton and Megan Palmer. This year the WoodyFest house band under the direction of Terry "Buffalo" Ware again lent support with Ware on guitar, Don Morris on bass, T.Z. Wright on keyboard and accordion, and Michael McCarty on drums.

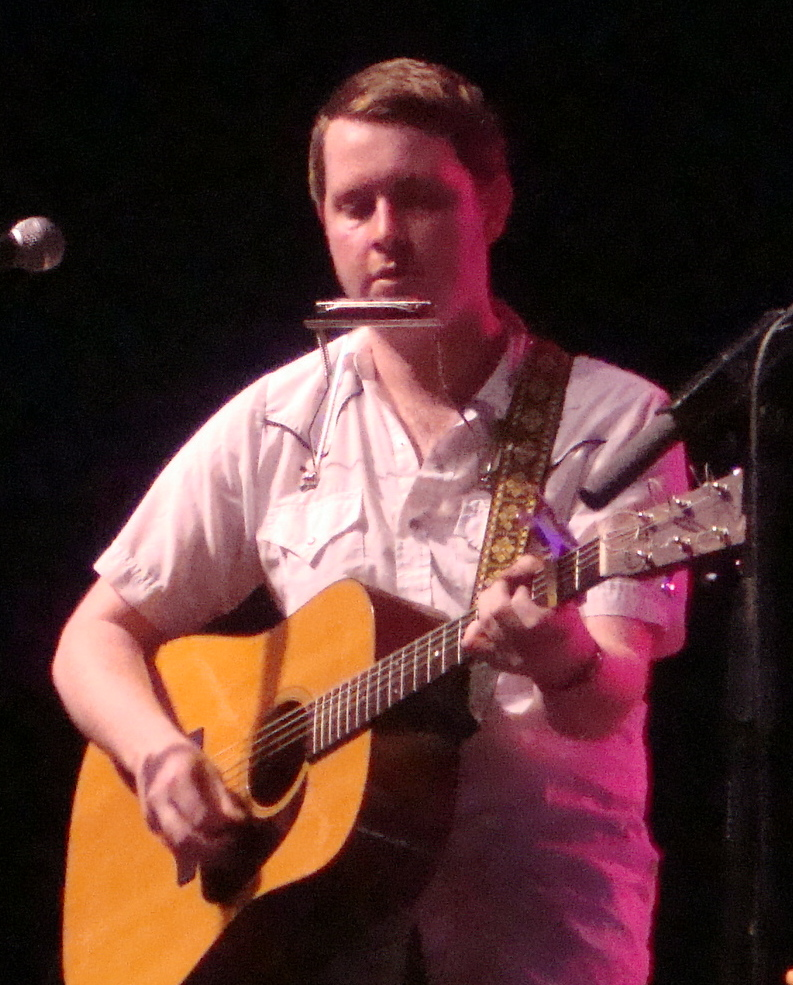
John Fullbright performing at the Pastures of Plenty. July 12, 2014.

With the closing of the Brick Street Cafe this year, the Crystal Theater hosted daytime performances on Thursday, Friday and Saturday. Performers included Lance Canales, Susan Herndon, Folk Uke (Amy Nelson and Cathy Guthrie), Ronny Cox, John Wort Hannam, Radoslav Lorkovic, Don Conoscenti, Nancy Apple, Wink Burcham, Annie Guthrie, Monica Taylor, David Amram, Audrey Auld, Larry Long, Grant Peeples, Rebecca Loebe, Anthony DaCosta, Ronny Elliott, Tim Easton, Mike Stinson and Ramsay Midwood. Evening performances at the Pastures of Plenty included Butch Hancok, SONiA & disappear fear (making her festival debut), the Red Dirt Rangers, Jimmy LaFave (Thursday headliner), Terri Hendrix with Lloyd Maines, Michael Fracasso, Trout Fishing in America, Ellis Paul (Friday headliner), Amy Speace, Joel Rafael and John Fullbright. Once again, Arlo Guthrie was the Saturday night closing headliner.

To compensate for the closing of the Brick Street Cafe, Okemah's Community Improvement Association hosted a daytime downtown stage on Friday and Saturday with mostly regional performers.

John Dillon and Vivian Nesbitt, hosts of the Art of the Song radio show, made their fourth visit to WoodyFest, this year interviewing Ellis Paul on Friday and Rebecca Loebe on Saturday. The interviews – which typically include the performance of one or two songs and a Q&A session with the audience – air at a later date.

Mary Jo Guthrie Edgmon – Guthrie's baby sister who is now 91 – once again hosted her pancake breakfast on Saturday.

In addition to musical events, non-musical presentations included retired minister Rev. Stephen Edington's "Woody and Jack: Two American Icons" – a presentation noting commonalities between Guthrie and Jack Kerouac. Will Kaufman, an English professor of American literature and culture, offered two presentations spanning Friday and Saturday: "Woody Guthrie: Hard Times and Hard Travelin'" and "The Long Road to Peekskill". Tim Z. Hernandez shared his research in discovering the names of the immigrants who died in the 1948 plane crash that inspired Guthrie's "Deportee (Plane Wreck at Los Gatos)" as his presentation "In Search of the Deportees". And finally the Woody Guthrie Poets, including Oklahoma Poet Laureate Nathan Brown, made their 10th annual WoodyFest appearance.

Once again, the Sunday noon "Hoot for Huntington's" closed the festival with the WoodyFest house band accompanying more than 20 performers, and ending with Don Morris leading everyone on Bob Childers' "Walking Woody's Road".

== 2015 ==
The 18th annual festival took place July 8–12, 2015. A substantial change took place in 2015 when the Coalition decided to charge admission for the first time. Persons aged 13 and above were required to have a wristband for admission to two of the four venues while the other two venues remained free of charge. This decision was made to keep the festival financially solvent. Other changes included adding daytime performances on Wednesday and offering three daytime stages instead of the typical two. Both of these changes increased the total number of performers to more than 90.

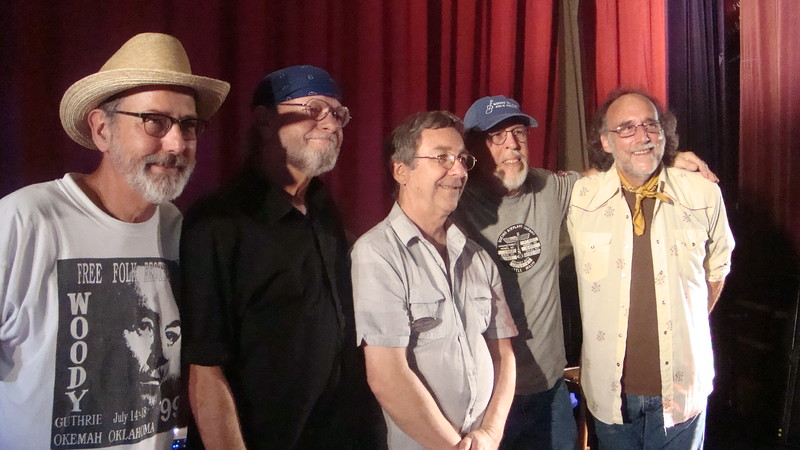
Members of the WoodyFest House Band: T.Z. Wright, Dan Duggin, Terry Ware, Michael McCarty, Don Morris. July 12, 2015.

A tribute to the late Bob Childers officially opened the festival on Wednesday evening at the Crystal Theatre. Performers at the tribute show included The Red Dirt Rangers, Monica Taylor, John Fullbright, Butch Hancock, Michael Fracasso, The Burns Sisters, Kevin & Dustin Welch, Susan Herndon, Gabe Marshall, Miss Brown to You, Kierston White, Byron White, Wink Burcham, Rick Reiley, Joe Baxter, and Terry "Buffalo" Ware & The Oklahoma Geniuses.

Two factors resulted in last-minute changes to the Thursday schedule. The first was torrential rain that fell on Oklahoma two days earlier and that day, turning the Pastures of Plenty outdoor venue into a field of mud and resulting in the Thursday evening performances being moved indoors to the Crystal Theatre. The second change was that Oklahoma Hall of Famer Tom Skinner was unable to perform his scheduled Thursday night set due to illness. In Skinner's absence, a group of musicians – Skinner's friends, colleagues, and proteges – performed songs written and/or often performed by Skinner. The group included John Fullbright, Monica Taylor and David Amram. Skinner died a few days later.

Headliners on the Pastures of Plenty outdoor stage included The Damn Quails. Ellis Paul, The Red Dirt Rangers, Michael Fracasso and John Fullbright. Musicians making their WoodyFest debut included Dan Navarro, Patrice Pike, Tish Hinojosa, and others. Hinojosa's bilingual set included her version of Guthrie's "Deportee (Plane Wreck at Los Gatos)" in Spanish. In an interview with The Oklahoman, Hinojosa said: "Of course, it's wonderful. For me to come solo is how I wanted to come, because something like a festival celebrating Woody Guthrie to me is about the lyrics and the stories. I was doing it Woody's way."

Four musicians performed concerts for children: Ellis Paul and Bob Livingstone (Friday) and The Red Dirt Rangers and Melissa Hembree (Saturday). Monica Taylor and Dan Navarro were interviewed at the 5th annual Art of the Song radio show tapings at WoodyFest.

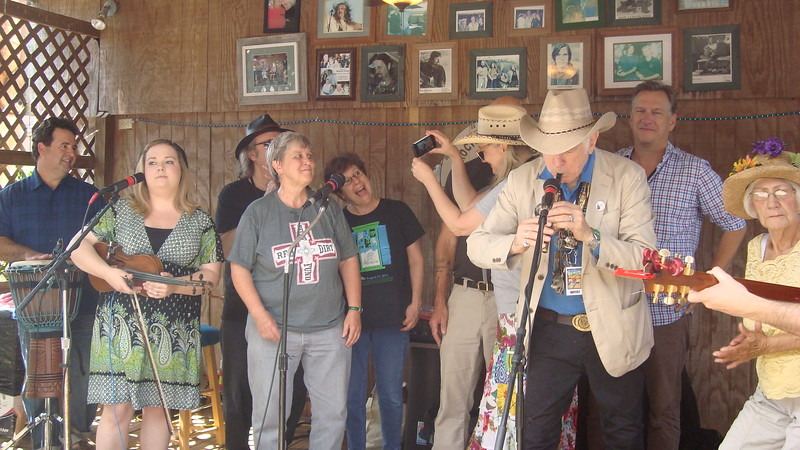
Musicians performing at Mary Jo's Pancake Breakfast. July 11, 2015.

In addition to music, several other events took place during the festival. Thomas Jones presented Woody Sed – his 1-man show about the life and times of Woody Guthrie. Featuring 19 songs, Jones portrays 25 different characters during the 90-minute play. A representative of the Woody Guthrie Center in Tulsa presented Adding to the Collection and Continuing Woody's Legacy. Reverend Stephan Edington returned for the third year and presented Woody: Seeking the Spirit in His Final Years. David Amram reminisced about meeting Woody Guthrie in 1956 and told the story behind his This Land: Symphonic Variations on a Song by Woody Guthrie at the History Center Museum. Barry Ollman presented Collecting Woody 2015. Pat Stewart, the harmonica man, gave harmonica lessons to children.

Miss Mary Jo Guthrie Edgmon once again was present for her annual Pancake Breakfast which was hosted this year by Lauren Lee. Terry "Buffalo" Ware once again coordinated the Sunday Hootennany to close the festival. Tim Easton opened the Hootenanny with his "Festival Song" singing "When we all come together, it feels like the world's gonna be all right".

== 2016 ==
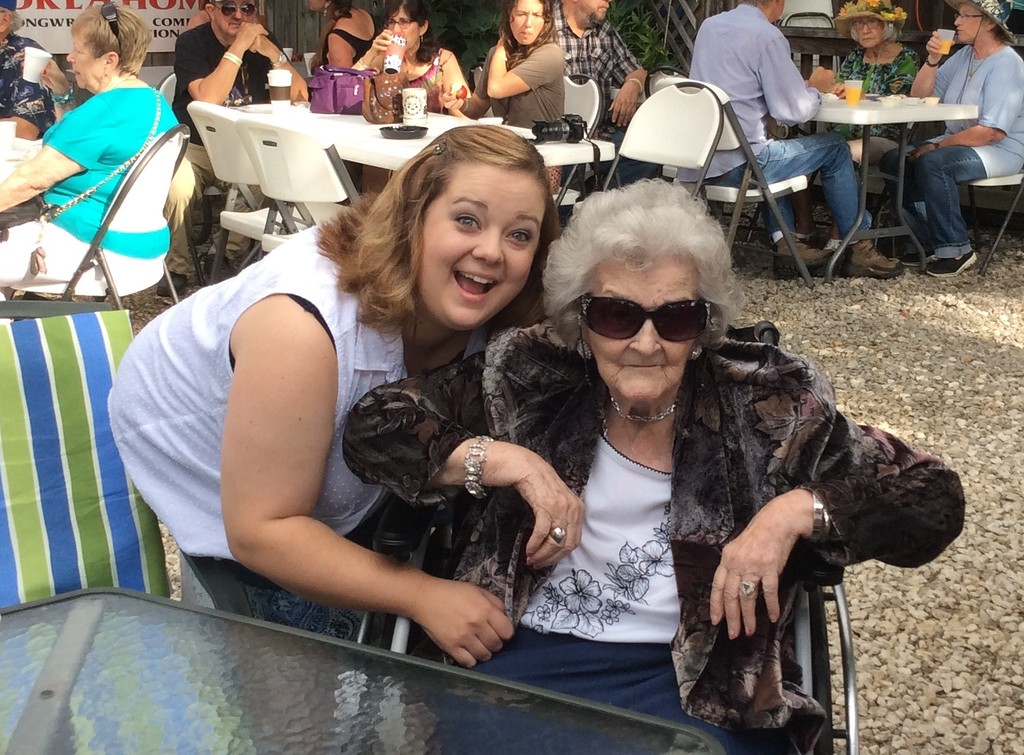
Lauren Lee and Mary Jo Guthrie Edgmon taken at 2016's "Mary Jo's Pancake Breakfast". Photo taken on the patio of Lou's Rocky Road Tavern in Okemah, OK – the location of the pancake breakfast, which Lauren Lee hosted.

The 19th annual festival took place July 13–17, 2016, opening with a sold-out show at the Crystal Theatre with Graham Nash. The concert opened Nash's summer tour in support of his most recent CD release This Path Tonight – his first solo release in 14 years. Nash was accompanied on stage by guitarist Shane Fontayne.

One major change at this year's festival was the addition of a permanent stage at the Pastures of Plenty. The permanent stage was constructed in cooperation with BancFirst and was relocated from the south end to the north end of the Pastures of Plenty so that it sits entirely on land owned by the Coalition. Writing for The Oklahoman, Nathan Poppe said the new stage "boasted the best lights and sound" he had ever experienced at the festival. "Officials said the new structure will help grow the Woody Guthrie Folk Festival and provide a space for the residents of Okemah and the surrounding area to gather for events throughout the year."

Due to heavy rains on Thursday, July 15, performances scheduled for the new outdoor stage had to be moved indoor to the Crystal Theatre. Performances moved indoor included The Turnpike Troubadours – who were making their WoodyFest debut.

Other 2016 debut artists included Dar Williams, The Honey Dewdrops, Jaimee Harris, and Caroline Doctorow. In total, there were more than 70 scheduled performers, many from Oklahoma including John Fullbright, Samantha Crain, the Red Dirt Rangers, Susan Herndon, John Calvin Abney, Shawna Russell, Monica Taylor, Annie Oakley, Lauren Lee, Ali Harter, Buffalo Rogers, Kierston White, Rick Reiley, as well as The Voice (U.S. season 10) contestant Justin Whisnant. Other returnees included Betty Soo, Melissa Hembree and Patrice Pike while WoodyFest returning regulars included Ellis Paul, Michael Fracasso, Sam Baker, Butch Hancock, David Amram and Don Conoscenti. Children's concerts included performances by Ellis Paul, the Red Dirt Rangers, and the "harmonica man" Patrick Stewart. In addition to the musical performances, the Coalition also provided lectures focusing on Woody Guthrie, including a presentation by Deana McCloud, Executive Director of Tulsa's Woody Guthrie Center, and Barry Ollman, Woody Guthrie memorabilia collector.

In addition to his Saturday headliner slot, Okemah-native John Fullbright joined several other artists on stage during the festival, accompanying David Amram, as well as performing during tribute sets to Bob Childers and Tom Skinner.

Jared Deck was the winner of this year's Woody Guthrie Festival Songwriting Contest and performed his winning song "American Dream" during his Saturday night performance. Deck – who has been writing songs for 15 years – said "The perspective that I have is that it's typically the people on bottom who carry the load and have to make the most sacrifices. I wanted a song that represented what everybody feels. ... I wanted to write something that spoke to the moment."

Two festival traditions continued in 2016: Mary Jo's Pancake Breakfast on Saturday and the Sunday "Hoot for Huntington's". Both are fundraisers for the Huntington's Disease Society of America.

== 2017 ==
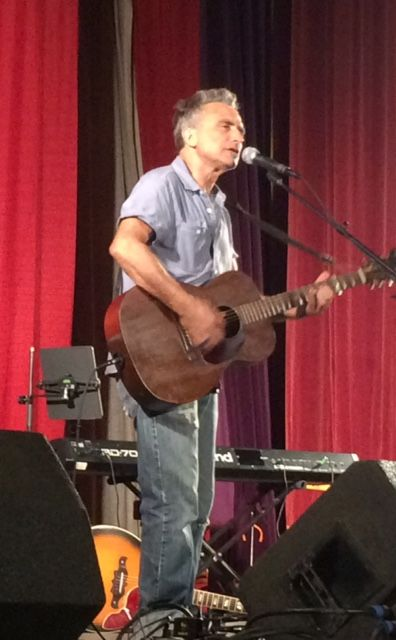
Michael Fracasso performing at the Jimmy LaFave tribute concert. July 12, 2017.

The 20th Annual festival was held July 12–16, 2017. With Jimmy LaFave's death less than two months prior, the opening night concert was a tribute to LaFave featuring members of his band, The Night Tribe (Bobby Kallus, John Inmon, Glenn Schuetz, and Radoslav Lorkovic). LaFave had been a regular at the festival since its inception, having performed at 17 WoodyFests, often as the Saturday night headliner. In addition, he served on the Woody Guthrie Coalition's Advisory Board. Musician Greg Jacobs said of the tribute: "It's fitting in that I don't think this festival would be here if it wasn't for Jimmy LaFave. Jimmy was here from the very start." Performers during the tribute included Andy Adams, the Burns Sisters, Michael Fracasso, John Fullbright, Jaimee Harris, Greg Jacobs, Levi Parham, Joel Rafael and the Red Dirt Rangers. In addition, there were performances by Lauren Lee, Anthony DaCosta, Danny Click, Jared Tyler, Robert S. Williams, Bob Livingston, Miss Brown to You (Mary Reynolds and Louise Goldberg), Lance Canales, Gene Williams, and more. Sarah Lee Guthrie, with nearly 30 other musicians on stage, closed the tribute with her grandfather's "This Land is Your Land".

Five stages were featured during the 20th Annual WoodyFest. A stage at the Hen House Cafe became an official festival stage for the first time this year. As in previous years, the festival also included poetry readings, open mics, children's concerts, educational presentations, songwriting workshops, and community outreach performances. Musicians who provided community outreach concerts at the Okemah Nutrition Center, Okemah Care Center and Colonial Park included Lauren Lee, Bob Livingston, Nancy Apple, Joseph Leavell, Joe Baxter and Larry Spears, and Cassie Latshaw. Many Oklahoma musicians traveled to Okemah to honor Okemah's dustbowl troubadour, including John Fullbright, Monica Taylor, Levi Parham, Wink Burcham, Jacob Tovar, Turnpike Troubadours, Miss Brown to You (Mary Reynolds and Louise Goldberg), Gabe Marshall, the Red Dirt Rangers and more. In addition to Oklahoma talent, other musicians – many who are regulars – included David Amram, Ellis Paul, Joel Rafael, Michael Fracasso, Sam Baker, Nancy Apple, Terri Hendrix, Butch Hancock, Rod Picott, SONiA and Amy Speace.

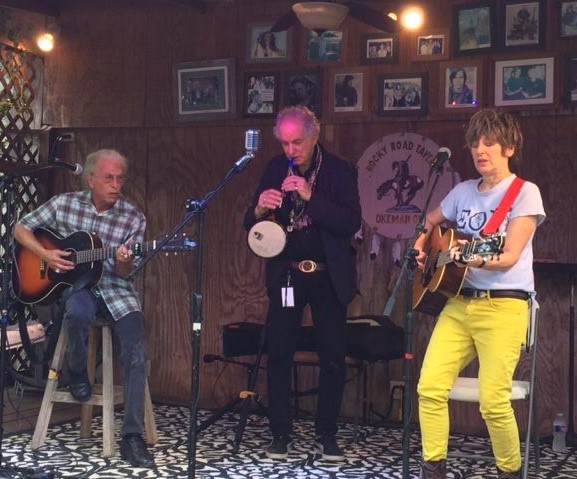
Joel Rafael, David Amram and SONiA performing at Mary Jo's Pancake Breakfast. July 15, 2017.

Early Saturday morning, Mary Jo Guthrie Edgmon hosted her annual Pancake Breakfast – a fundraiser for the Huntington's Disease Society of America. This year, Joel Rafael served as emcee.

Several special presentations, some that included book signings, took place at the 2017 festival. Tim Z. Hernandez told the story behind his book All They Will Call You – based on Woody Guthrie's song "Plane Wreck at Los Gatos (Deportee)". Therese Crutcher-Marin, a board member of the Northern California Chapter of the Huntington's Disease Society of America, presented "Watching Their Dance: Three Sisters, A Genetic Disease and Marrying into a Family At Risk for Huntington's". Tom Breiding, musician in-residence for the United Mine Workers of America, presented his musical program The Unbroken Circle describing how he helped win back the pensions and health benefits for 18,000 retired coal miners. Anna Canoni, Woody's granddaughter and Senior Operations Manager for Woody Guthrie Publications, presented I Ain't Dead Yet: New Songs from the Woody Guthrie Archives. Lauren Lee coordinated Woody's Kids – a special songwriting workshop for the younger folks, while Ellis Paul taught a songwriting workshop for adults.

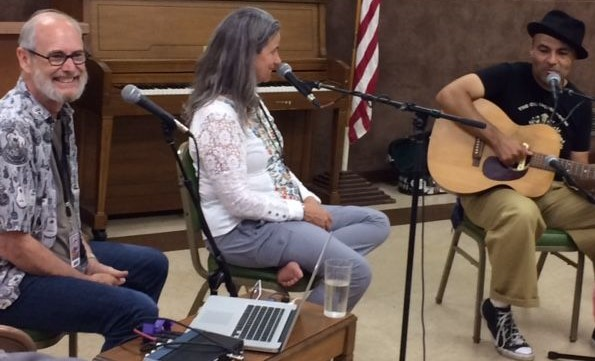
John Dillon and Vivian Nesbitt interviewing Lance Canales. July 14, 2017.

For the 7th consecutive year, John Dillon and Vivian Nesbitt, hosts of Art of the Song: Creativity Radio, a 1-hour radio show airing on more than 100 radio stations across the U.S. and Canada, taped two interviews in front of a live audience to be broadcast later. This year's interviewees were Lance Canales and K.C. Clifford. The interviews typically include one or two songs and end with an audience Q&A session.

In addition to having a tribute to Jimmy LaFave in the festival program booklet, WoodyFest also acknowledged the death of long-time festival supporter, Lou Johnson, who died on November 9, 2016. In addition to hosting Mary Jo's Pancake Breakfast at her place of business, the Rocky Road Tavern, Johnson also hosted the daily open mics.

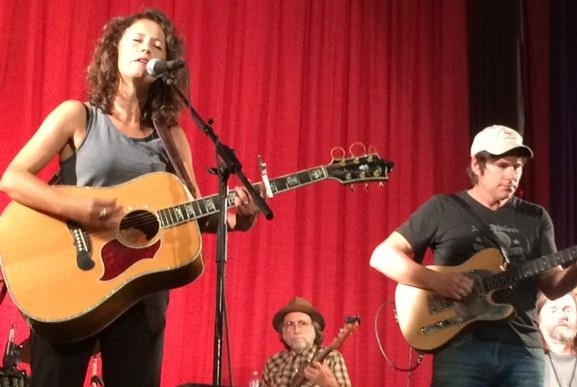
Sarah Lee Guthrie and her husband Johnny Irion performing at the Hoot for Huntington's. July 16, 2017.

As in previous years, the festival ended with the Sunday Hoot for Huntington's, which raises money for the Huntington's Disease Society of America.

Sarah Lee Guthrie, with other members of the Guthrie family, was the Friday night headlining act at the Pastures of Plenty. Her father, Arlo Guthrie, was the Saturday night headliner. Other Guthrie-family performers in attendance both nights were Cole Quest (Woody's grandson) and Cathie Guthrie (Woody's granddaughter), who, along with Amy Nelson, is one half of the duo Folk Uke. Many other younger Guthries were also on stage.

== 2018 ==
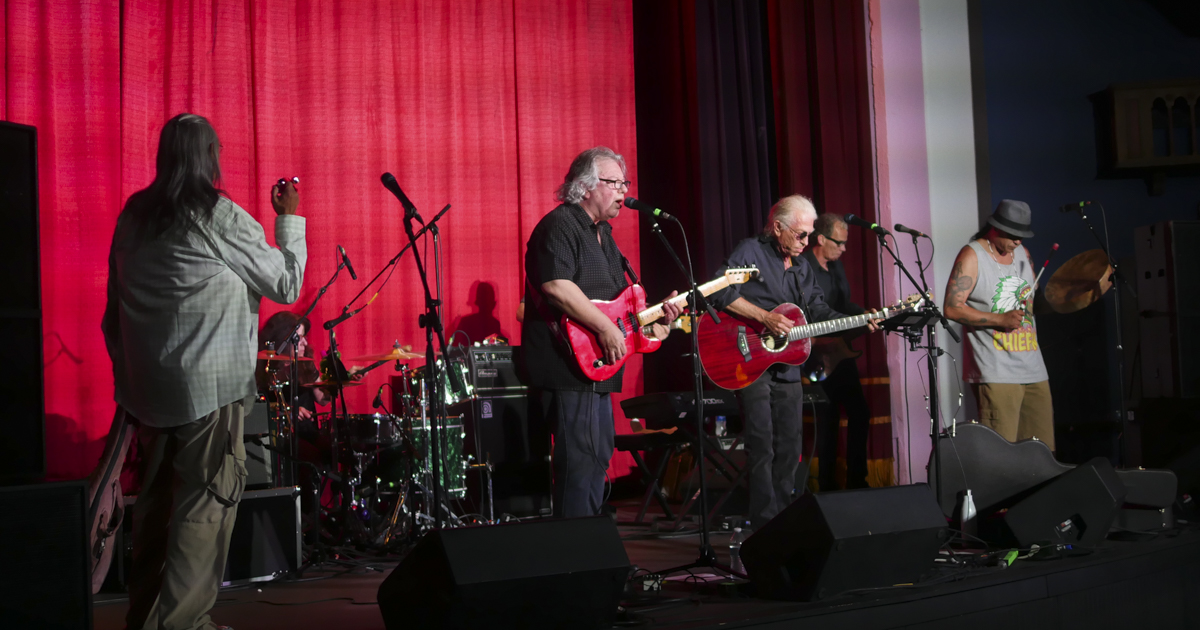
Joel Rafael with John Trudell's Bad Dog Band opening the 2018 festival. July 11, 2018.

The 21st Annual festival featuring more than 90 musicians took place July 11–15, 2018 and kicked-off with a Wednesday night ticketed event featuring Joel Rafael and John Trudell's Bad Dog Band. "After their show-stopping set in the Pastures of Plenty at last year's WoodyFest, the Woody Guthrie Coalition is thrilled to begin this year's festival with this special benefit presentation of Joel Rafael with John Trudell's Bad Dog. After hearing John Trudell speak at Peace Sunday, in 1982, Rafael became an advocate for Indigenous Rights, sharing John's words and following his trail for over 20 years, until the two began regularly performing and eventually writing together."

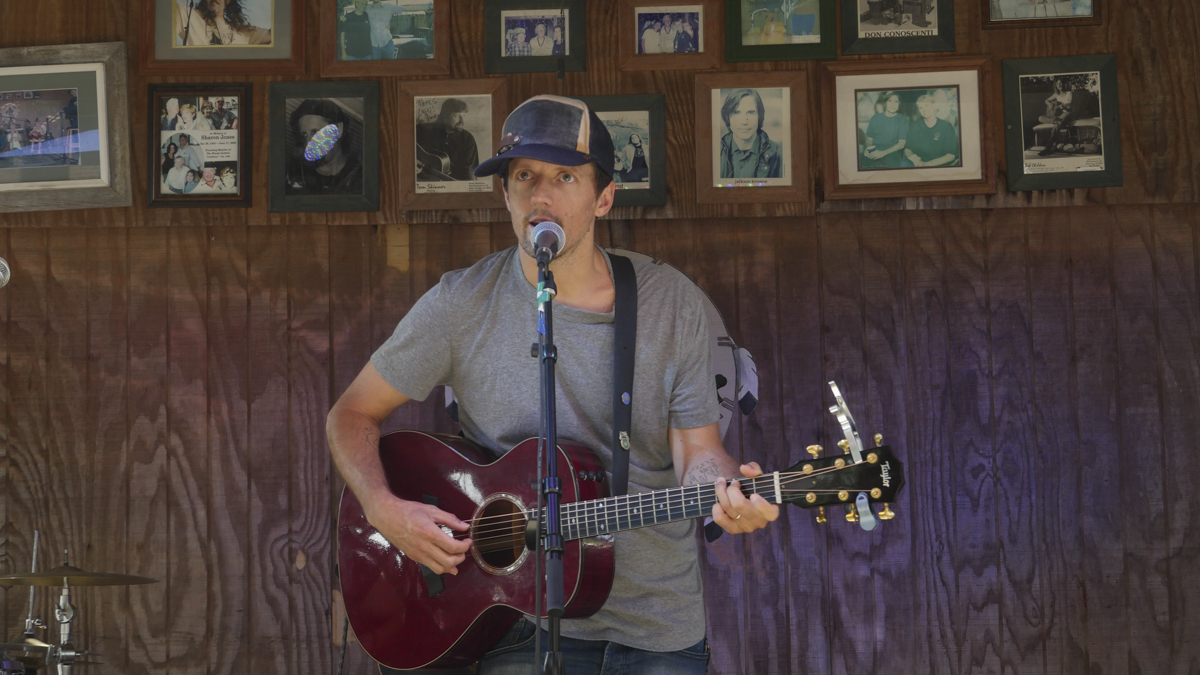
In addition to his headlining performance, Jason Mraz also performed at Mary Jo's Pancake Breakfast. July 14, 2018.

Grammy award-winner, Jason Mraz, made his WoodyFest debut as the Friday night headliner at the Pastures of Plenty. Members of the Guthrie family scheduled to perform included second-generation granddaughter Annie Guthrie, grandson Cole Quest and his band the City Pickers, and granddaughter Sarah Lee Guthrie's husband Johnny Irion. In addition, third-generation family members scheduled to perform included Serena Guthrie, Sophie Irion, Marjorie Guthrie, Jacklyn Guthrie, and Shivadas Guthrie.

Other performers over the course of the 5-day festival included Joel Rafael, Carter Sampson, John Fullbright, The Turnpike Troubadours, Ellis Paul, Willis Alan Ramsay, Opal Agafia and the Sweet Nothings and Willie Watson – the latter two also making their festival debut.

Fifteen-year-old Ken Pomeroy, first-place-winner of the inaugural Jimmy LaFave Songwriting Competition – held in May 2018 at the Bob Childers' Gypsy Cafe in Stillwater, Oklahoma – made her third festival appearance. Her winning song, titled "The Sidewalk Song", addresses homelessness. When Ken (whose name is short for McKenan) was in the 8th grade, she wrote a 9-minute song about Woody Guthrie for National History Day Contest that won both regional and state competitions, enabling her to also compete at the national level in Washington, DC. "Woody Guthrie in general has always been a really influential person to me, especially because of his conversation topics in his songwriting," said Pomeroy, 15, who counts the protest song "Deportee (Plane Wreck at Los Gatos)" among her favorite Guthrie tunes."

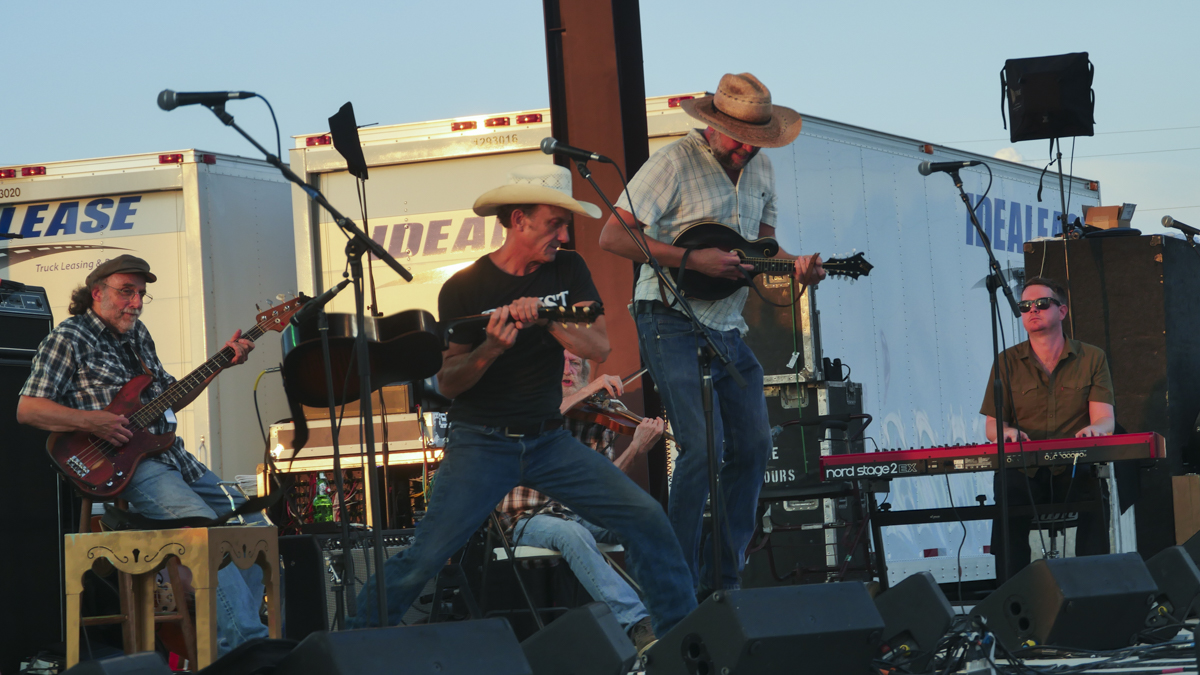
The Red Dirt Rangers opened the Thursday night performances at the Pastures of Plenty. July 12, 2018.

The festival once again offered a plethora of educational programs (musical and non-musical) and events for children. These included the 8th annual Art of the Song radio show interviews. Art of the Song hosts John Dillon and Vivian Nesbitt interviewed Nancy Apple and Radoslav Lorković. Vivian Nesbitt also performed her 1-woman play Mother Jones in Heaven followed by a discussion on the importance of labor unions facilitated by Tom Breiding and Dan Navarro.The Woody Guthrie Poets made their 14th consecutive visit to the festival; this year hosted by Dorothy Alexander, Jessica Issacs and Branwyn Holroyd. Deana McCloud from the Woody Guthrie Center in Tulsa presented Artifacts and Virtual Reality about the Center's new Dust Bowl Virtual Reality Experience. Tom Breiding presented The Unbroken Circle: Songs of the West Virginia Coalfields. Two songwriting workshops were held; one for children hosted by Lauren Lee and one for adults hosted by Ellis Paul. Barry Ollman returned for his 12th consecutive presentation of Collecting Woody.

The festival once again ended on Sunday with the traditional Hoot for Huntington's – an all-star jam that benefits the Huntington's Disease Society of America.

== 2019 ==
The 22nd Annual WoodyFest was held July 10–14, 2019. Headlining performers this year included Arlo Guthrie, Willie Watson, John Paul White, Jaimee Harris, Joel Rafael, Ellis Paul, John Fullbright, Jamie Lin Wilson, Count TuTu, Jacob Tovar, Levi Parham, Red Dirt Rangers and Randy Crouch, plus Nina Gerber, Pam Delgado and Jeri Jones performing “The Songs of Audrey Auld.” Members of the Guthrie family, in addition to Arlo, included Annie Guthrie, Serena Guthrie, Krishna Guthrie Band and Folk Uke.

== WoodyFest quotes ==
"From the very first time I put my foot on the dirt of the festival, I've just felt nothing but welcome in this place. That's probably the best thing about it, is that it's a chance for people to make connections." – Mary Reynolds

"The Woody Guthrie Folk Festival is a perfect tribute to the spirit of Woody Guthrie and his beloved hometown of Okemah, and an important cultural event for all of America, setting an example of how to do things right, and celebrate the arts in a joyous way where the community and the artists all join hands to give our young people standards of excellence to aspire to for whatever they do in life."—David Amram

"This is just a special festival. Woody Guthrie is the heart of the whole folk music thing and folk music has taken on a new role."—Joel Rafael

When invited back for the 2nd annual festival, Ellis Paul accepted the invitation agreeing to perform at the 1999 festival "and every one until the end of time."—Ellis Paul

"...it is not unusual to see impromptu bands form for jams...and we the audience get to see collaborations that we could only normally dream about."—Jela Webb

"...there's definitely something special going on in that scene. It's almost an American music festival secret. It's like beyond description....like, something is happening there that's literally changing the universe....it's rearranging the molecules of the planet...such really soulful musicians."—Jimmy LaFave

"I think the spirit of Woody Guthrie is really alive at that festival, just because I think everybody comes there with a passion for songs and storytelling."—Samantha Crain
