= Don Conoscenti =

American singer-songwriter

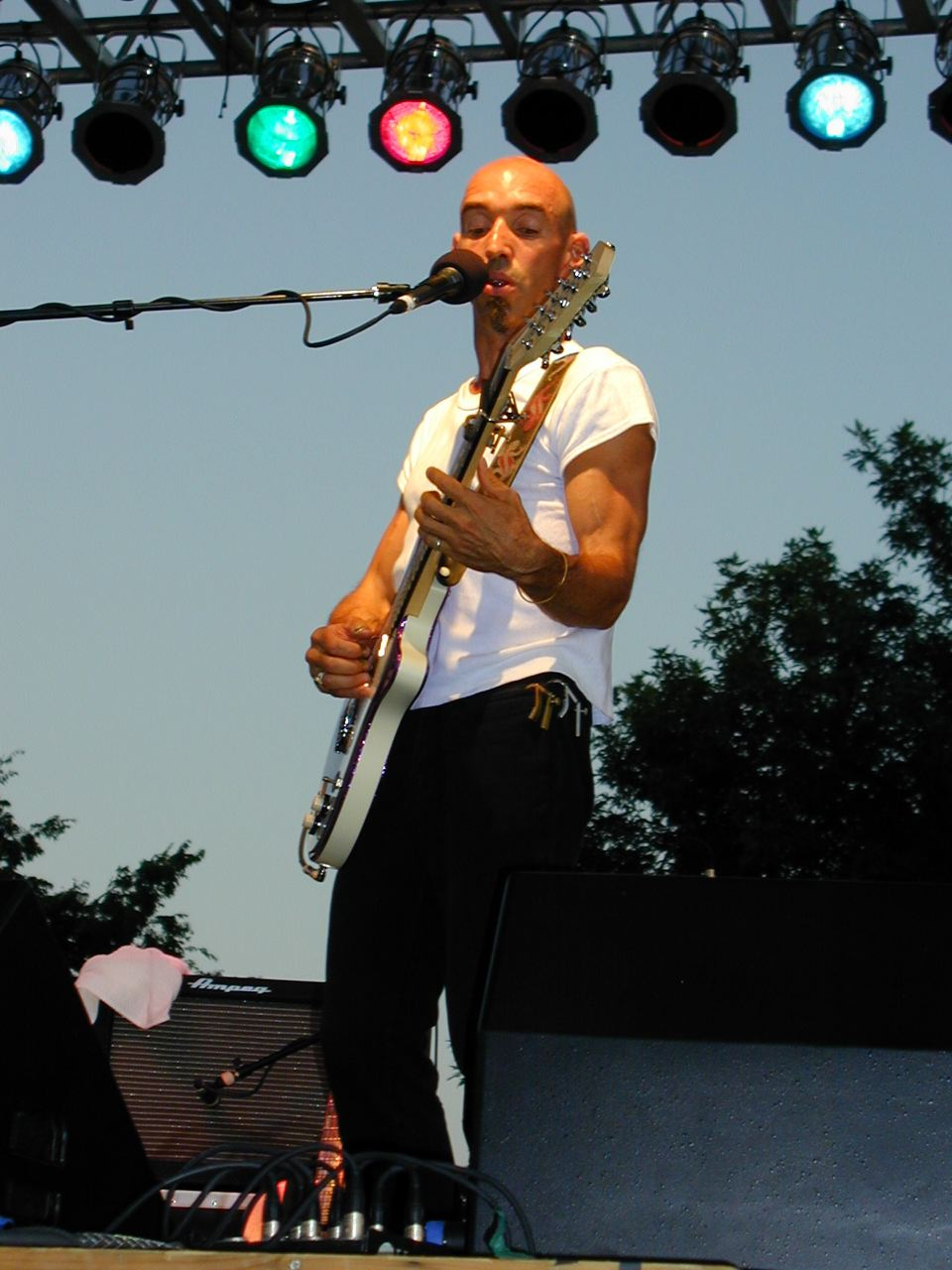
- Don Conoscenti at the Woody Guthrie Folk Festival, 2001

Background information
- Born: Don Conoscenti; September 13, 1955 (age 71); Chicago, Illinois
- Genres: Folk, pop, jazz, blues
- Occupation: Singer-songwriter
- Instruments: Vocals, guitar, piano, banjo, steel guitar, drums
- Years active: 1975–present
- Label: Cogtone
- Website: www.donconoscenti.com

Don Conoscenti (born September 13, 1955) is an American singer-songwriter, record producer, and multi-instrumentalist originally from Chicago, Illinois. He started his musical career in middle school playing drums, before receiving a guitar as a gift from a cousin for his 8th grade graduation. Conoscenti became known for his unique use of multiple and partial capos on the acoustic guitar, releasing an instructional video Capo Abuse and Guitar Techniques in 2001. He has played with many notable musicians, including Kristian Bush, David Wilcox, Ellis Paul, John Mayer, Nils Lofgren, Robert Mirabal, Bill Miller (musician), and The Indigo Girls, and he produced Dave Nachmanoff.

Conoscenti was a winner of the Rocky Mountain Folks Fest Songwriting Competition and was a National Academy of Songwriters’ Acoustic Artist of the Year finalist. He has performed twice on the Millennium Stage of the Kennedy Center. Following his 1999 performance at the Kennedy Center, the Library of Congress added a collection of Conoscenti's work to their folk revivalist archives. Conoscenti has been a regular at the Woody Guthrie Folk Festival since its inception in 1998. He has released nine CDs to date, all but one on his Cogtone label.

== Background ==
Conoscenti grew up in the Chicago area and first played drums in garage bands and flute in his high school symphony band. His musical influences were diverse while at home he heard his mother's big band music while his father listened to the music of Frank Sinatra, Vic Damone, and Tony Bennett. Conoscenti also listened to Chicago radio station WLS-FM which played a lot of Detroit "Motown" music. He bought his first acoustic guitar for $50 in 1974 in Boulder, Colorado at a yard sale, and began writing songs and performing in public. A self-taught musician, Conoscenti said he learned to play guitar by watching and listening to other musicians. Conoscenti began to experiment with psychedelics, and spent many hours in the meditation hall of the Naropa Institute in Boulder during the summer that Ram Dass was doing a residency there. This was on the heels of Dass's seminal book Be Here Now, published in 1971. That summer culminated in a spiritual awakening that set Conoscenti on his lifelong spiritual path. In late 1971 Conoscenti hitchhiked to California where he continued to write songs and play guitar. Don's spiritual training continued in a San Jose barrio where he fasted, meditated, and widened his cultural horizons.

== Career ==
=== 1975–1990 ===
In 1975 Conoscenti returned to Chicago where he started to play hootenannies at the Earl of Old Town, and at Steve Goodman's folk club Somebody Else's Troubles. Conoscenti spent extensive time at these clubs with Goodman and John Prine, who had just been signed by record label Stax.

Conoscenti left Chicago again and traveled extensively throughout the country, absorbing different musical styles at each stop. In 1976, Conoscenti formed his first rock band while working behind the counter at the original Ben & Jerry's in Vermont. Conoscenti first learned the blues at after-hours jam sessions with founders Ben Cohen and Jerry Greenfield. He also got his first paying gigs as a singer-songwriter and as a sideman, and experienced his first recording sessions.

Late in 1976, Conoscenti moved to Stowe, Vermont and worked in the kitchen of the Lodge at Mt. Mansfield. He was mentored in the blues by wine steward Arnold Carbone who went on to become Director of Research & Development for Ben & Jerry's. Conoscenti and Carbone also formed a blues duo called Chicago Don and Little Arnold.

In 1978, Conoscenti formed a band called Zucchini Brothers, with music that was original and at times theatrical. Vermont in the 1970s was a hotbed of writers, actors, thinkers, musicians, much like Greenwich Village in the 1960s.

Conoscenti befriended writer David Mamet, and also worked with members of the politically active Bread and Puppet Theater. For most of the late 1980s, Conoscenti did not play or perform. He lived a solitary life in California, Martha's Vineyard, and Colorado, and occupied himself with various spiritual pursuits.

=== 1990 to 2003 ===
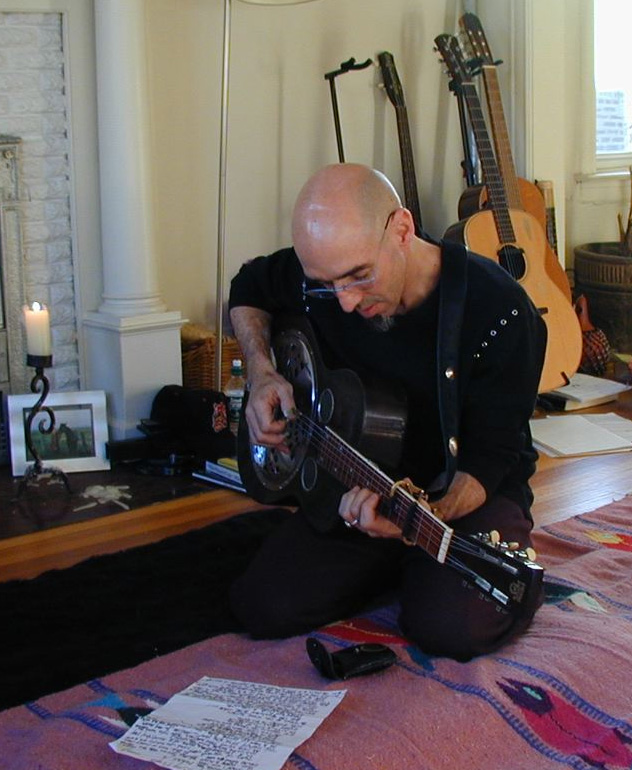
Don Conoscenti with Dobro-Guitar

In 1991 Conoscenti moved to Atlanta to revisit acoustic music. He first played at The Freight Room in Decatur, GA, which was one of the favored places to play acoustic music in the Atlanta area at the time, along with the Trackside Tavern. The Trackside Tavern was managed by Eddie Owens, who went on to open Eddie's Attic in Decatur in 1992.

During his years in Atlanta, he became friends with David Wilcox. Wilcox along with Boston-based musician, Jim Infantino, introduced Conoscenti to the use of partial capos. Conoscenti's unique style developed while "trying to be percussive, trying to be fat, trying to cover the low end, trying to be melodic and rhythmic. I missed the harmonies so I put the harmonies on the instrument – and it's really fun for me to play the guitar."

The Atlanta acoustic music scene at the time was split between the Trackside and The Freight Room. When The Freight Room closed in 1992, Conoscenti, Wilcox, and most of Atlanta's other notable musicians like The Indigo Girls, Shawn Mullins, Kristian Bush, and others moved to Eddie's Attic. His first record, Carved in Stone on the DB Records label was released that year, followed by Beneath Your Moon. In 1994, he met Ellis Paul at Eddie's, and the two have been close friends and collaborators since. Conoscenti frequently plays guitar at Paul's shows around the country, including accompanying Paul for many years at his traditional New Year's Eve shows at Club Passim in Cambridge, Massachusetts. Conoscenti left Atlanta that year and toured the country almost continuously until 2004. During that time he released Boxes of Bones, My Brilliant Masterpiece, One for the Road, Mysterious Light, Paradox of Grace, Extremely Live at Eddie's Attic, and Turn Here. Mysterious Light climbed into the top 20 albums played by folk and acoustic DJs worldwide. In his review of My Brilliant Masterpiece for the Folk and Acoustic Music Exchange, Shawn Linderman said:

"Weaving in and out of love from both directions, touching on friendships and loss, Don Conoscenti's latest solo acoustic work is cozy and warm. But don't be misled into thinking these tunes are slow and simple. Don can be blistering away on guitar, stretching his vocal range to its limits and interspersing wild wails and growls, and yet the song still comes across as comforting. Don't ask me how he does it-- that's what's so damned fascinating about his music!"

In her review of Extremely Live at Eddie's Attic, Ellen Rawson said: "Listening to the album, it's sometimes hard to believe that there is only one guitarist creating all of that sound, whether he's on a 6-string, 12-string or steel guitar."

Paradox of Grace includes a duet with Ellis Paul on the song "The Other Side" – a song that seems to provide comfort to those who have lost loved ones. Widespread exposure from this song after September 11, 2001, resulted in Conoscenti performing the song on the television show Crossing Over with John Edward.

In 2000, Conoscenti produced Dave Nachmanoff's album A Certain Distance.

=== 2003 to present ===
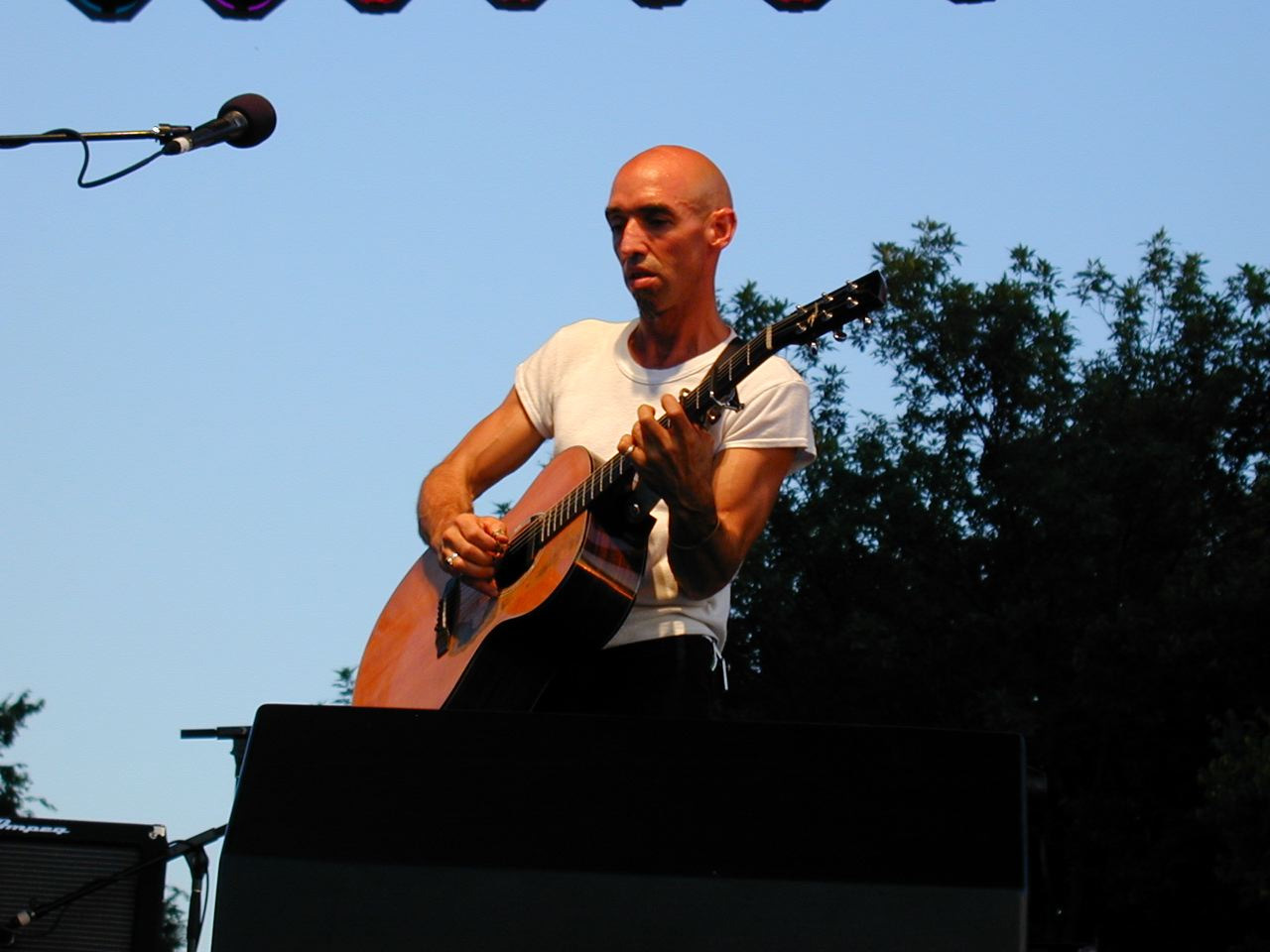
Don Conoscenti at Woodyfest 2003

In 2003, the Archive of Folk Culture of the American Folklife Center added a collection of Don Conoscenti material. The collection includes two song manuscripts with lyrics by Conoscenti; ten unpublished sound recordings of radio broadcasts and performances by Don Conoscenti, dated 1999–2002; and two compact discs (one autographed, and the other a compilation entitled "Oasis Acoustic"). The collection also includes 16 photographs, most are photos of Conoscenti in performance, dated 1996–1999, with descriptions written on the backs of the photos; 13 color inkjet prints of landscapes in the American West, from "American Road Show, Photography by Don Conoscenti," signed and dated by Conoscenti, 2001–2003, with a poster advertising this photography show. Also included is a videocassette of Conoscenti's 2002 performance on Crossing Over with John Edward and his videocassette Capo Abuse and Guitar Techniques.

In 2005, Conoscenti returned to Chicago for a year while studying jazz, guitar and voice. But the following year he settled in Taos, New Mexico, where he continues to study jazz as he also explores the blues, Americana, and rock as a member of several bands.

In 2007, Conoscenti was one of seven "10-year artists" recognized as having performed at every Woody Guthrie Folk Festival to date. At a concert held in Okemah, Oklahoma's Crystal Theater, Conoscenti performed at a "10-year jam" benefit show along with Bob Childers, Jimmy LaFave, Joel Rafael, Ellis Paul, the Red Dirt Rangers, and Terry "Buffalo" Ware.

In her review of the 2011 Woody Guthrie Folk Festival, Jela Webb said that Conoscenti's set "with Patrick Turnmire on percussion, Dan Daily on saxophone and Terry "Buffalo" Ware, on guitar, was a joy to behold. Conoscenti is one of the most underrated and under-appreciated musicians; his own body of work deserves much greater recognition."

In the fall of 2013, Conoscenti joined the band of SONiA and disappear fear for a 54-city tour in the U.S. and Canada that included stops on the west coast in Portland, Seattle, San Francisco, Vancouver and Los Angeles and in the east in New York City and Boston. Conoscenti was also a featured guitarist on disappear fear's 2013 release Broken Film recorded in Nashville by Mike Poole in December 2012.

== Discography ==
Year	Title	Record label
2015	Anastasia	Howlin' Dog
2009	Turn Here	Cogtone
2002	Extremely Live at Eddie's Attic	Cogtone
2002	Paradox of Grace	Cogtone
1999	Mysterious Light	Cogtone
1998	One for the Road	Cogtone
1997	My Brilliant Masterpiece	Cogtone
1996	Boxes of Bones	Cogtone
1994	Beneath Your Moon	Cogtone
1992	Carved in Stone	DB Records
