= The Burns Sisters =

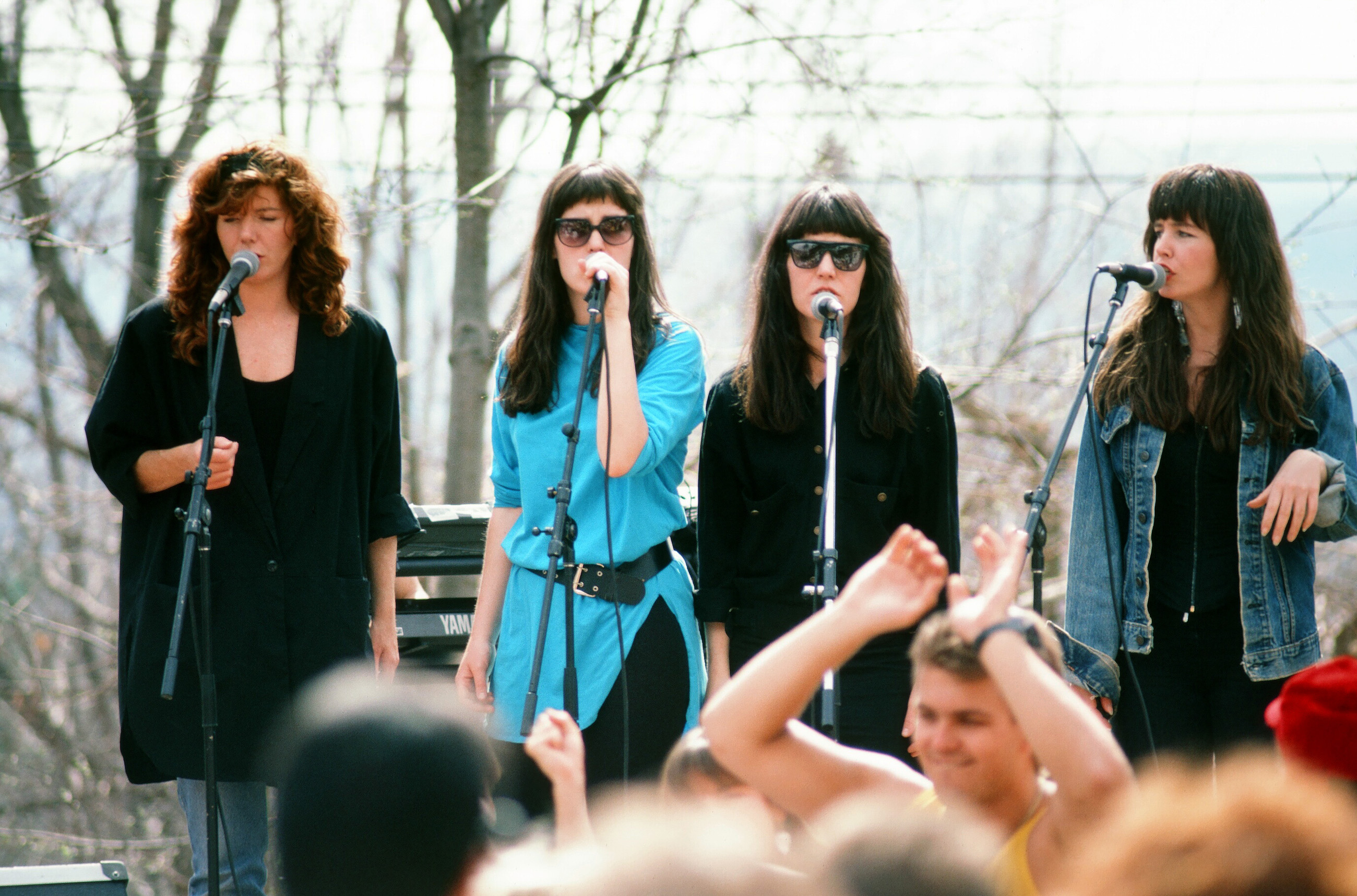
- The Burns Sisters perform in their hometown of Ithaca, New York, in April 1987.

Background information
- Origin: Ithaca, New York, U.S.
- Genre: folk · pop
- Occupation: singers · songwriter
- Instrument: vocals · guitar · mandolin
- Years active: 1986–present
- Labels: Columbia, Rounder
- Website: www.theburnssisters.com

The Burns Sisters are an American folk music group from Ithaca, New York. The group has performed and recorded with various siblings, most recently consisting of sisters Marie and Annie. They have toured with Arlo Guthrie, providing backup vocals and occasionally performing as his opening act.

== Early life ==
The Burns Sisters were raised as members of a large Irish Catholic family of 12 children in Binghamton, New York. Their music has been influenced by their father's political activism and their mother's background as a classically trained opera singer. Singing, playing, and writing music was a family tradition.

== Career ==
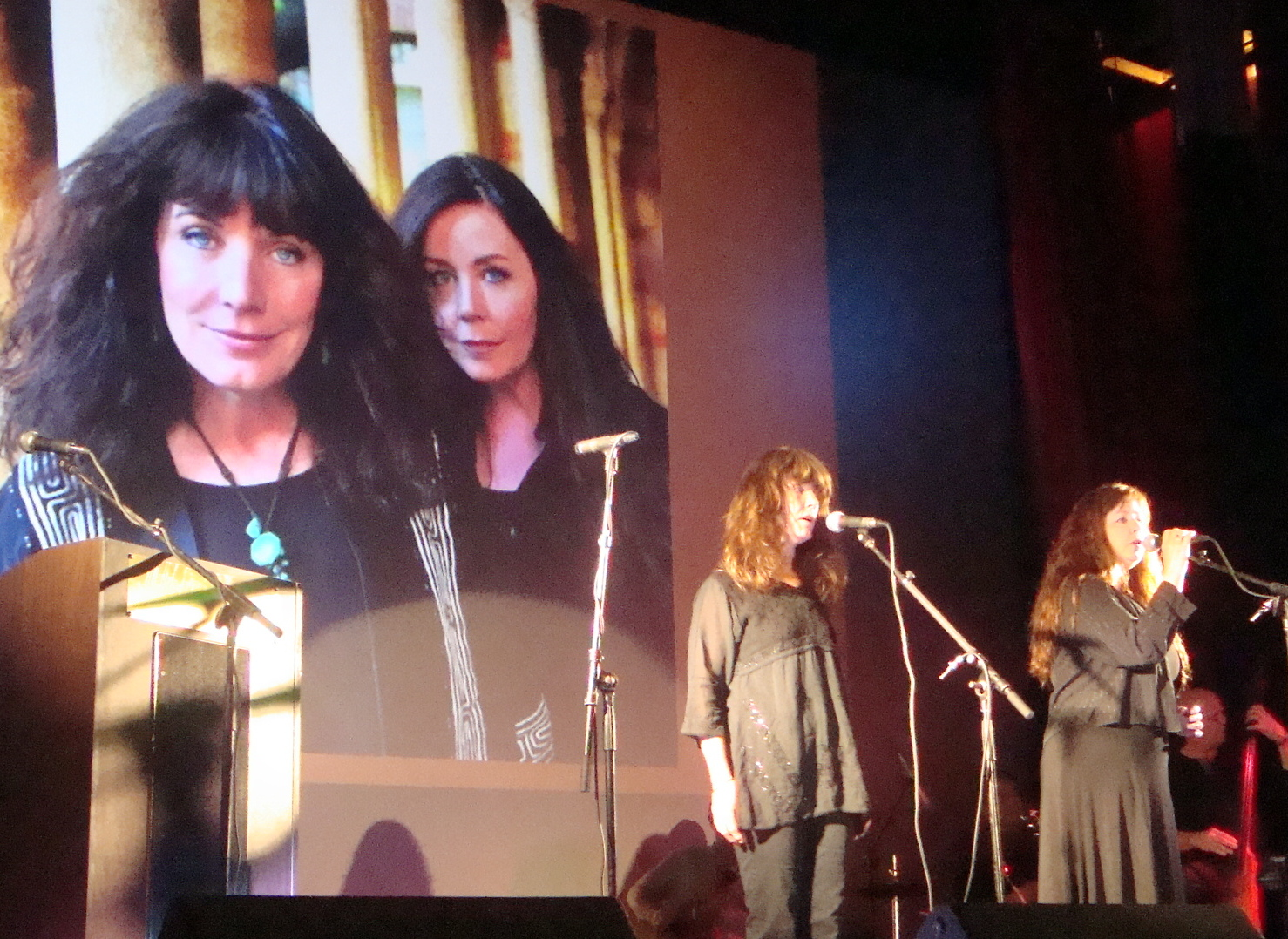
Marie and Annie Burns performing at the Woody Guthrie Folk Festival, Okemah, Oklahoma, on July 10, 2013

The Burns Sisters' professional musical career began when several of the sisters moved to Ithaca, New York, where they originally sang with the David Kent Band. One of their earliest successes was when their music appeared in the Louis Malle film Atlantic City (1980) as a result of their brother Patrick working on the film. As a quintet made up of sisters Sheila (1950-2023), Marie (born c. 1957), Annie (born c. 1961), Jeannie (born c. 1958), and Terry (born 1963), the band released The Burns Sisters Band (1986), and Endangered Species (1989). In 1993, the quintet released Songs of the Heart before older sisters Terry and Sheila dropped out to devote more time to their families. Agreeing to continue as a trio, Annie, Marie and Jeannie switched their focus to acoustic music.

Marie and Annie have been the primary writers and producers of the group. Most performances are with a full band which includes a dobro player, guitarist, and Marie Burns on mandolin.

In 1995, they signed with Rounder/Philo Records and released four albums for the label over the next several years, including 1996's holiday album titled Tradition: Holiday Songs Old and New which was reviewed for the Folk and Acoustic Music Exchange. Their 1997 album, In This World, was produced by bassist Garry Tallent, who added a more rock-based sound.

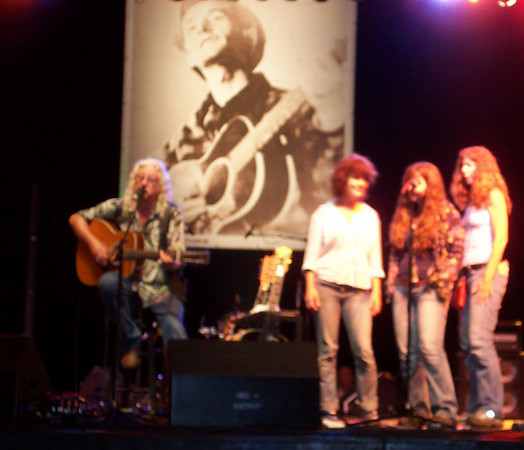
Performing with Arlo Guthrie at the Woody Guthrie Folk Festival. July 14, 2007.

In 2004, the Burns Sisters met Arlo Guthrie at the Woody Guthrie Folk Festival. This meeting resulted in the sisters touring with Arlo in 2005 on his "Arlo Guthrie and Friends Ridin' on the City of New Orleans – Benefiting Victims of Katrina" tour and again on his "The Lost World Tour" in 2008–09.

In 2012, the Burns Sisters released their album The Hills of Ithaca. The title was inspired by a 1947 Woody Guthrie poem which the Burns Sisters put to music after being given the unpublished version by Woody's daughter, Nora Guthrie. The album also includes Bob Childers' song "Prisoner of the Promised Land," written in Okemah, Oklahoma, while attending the Woody Guthrie Folk Festival. The album includes two songs by Jeannie Burns: "Underbelly Blues," which she co-wrote with Andrew Hardin – her partner in the duo Hardin Burns – and "Your Kiss," which she wrote with Hardin and her sister Marie.

Jeannie Burns left the band in 2013 to study guitar and songwriting, with Marie and Annie continuing to perform as a duo.

Sheila Burns died on November 9, 2023 at age 73.

== Discography ==
Year	Title	Record label
2012	The Hills of Ithaca	Sistersmusic
2006	Wild Bouquet	Ithaca Records
2000	Out of the Blue	Rounder/Philo
1997	In This World	Rounder/Philo
1996	Tradition: Holiday Songs Old & New	Rounder/Philo
1995	Close to Home	Rounder/Philo
1992	Songs of the Heart	Independent
1989	Endangered Species	Columbia
1986	I Wonder Who's Out Tonight	Sony/BMG
1986	The Burns Sisters Band	Columbia
