= Nancy Apple =

American musician

Nancy Apple, professionally known as the "Cadillac Cowgirl", is an American musician, songwriter, producer, radio personality, former NARAS executive, and owner of the independent record label Ringo Records. She is based in Memphis, Tennessee, and started her career in the 1980s. She has collaborated in songwriting with Keith Sykes and other professionals in Memphis, Nashville, Tennessee, and Austin, Texas. Her first album, Outside the Lines was released in 2001.
