= Susan Herndon =

American singer-songwriter

Background information
- Origin: Tulsa, Oklahoma
- Genres: Folk rock jazz red dirt
- Instrument(s): Vocals, guitar, piano, accordion, bass guitar
- Years active: 2000–present
- Labels: Turtle Music
- Members: Susan Herndon Jeff Graham; Dave White; Michael Steed
- Website: http://www.susanherndon.com/

Susan Herndon is an American singer-songwriter from Tulsa, Oklahoma. The Tulsa World has called her one of the "region's most talented musicians;" while the (now-defunct) free paper Urban Tulsa Weekly has praised Herndon's ability to "deliver lyrics in a manner that hits close to the heart and draws an emotional response." Though Herndon has released several albums, she is probably better known in the Tulsa area for playing live in cafes, bars, and festivals. She typically performs original compositions, accompanying herself on acoustic guitar.

Susan Herndon made her recording debut in 2000, with Quiet Cave. Her first studio effort gained a boost when NPR featured its song "The Drum" on their program All Songs Considered. Three years afterwards, in 2003, she followed up with In The Attic. Peccadillos, released in 2005, is technically a double album (though there are a mere 16 tracks total) composed of Mister Bed and Women and Children First. In recording 2007's 1,000 Pies, Herndon employed the musical talents of several fellow Oklahomans.

Asked whether she considers herself a folk artist or a singer-songwriter, Herndon said she sees herself as "definitely more a songwriter," explaining that her "songs dictate (the style)" and form taken by her music as a whole.

Before establishing herself as a musician in her own regard, Herndon took guitar lessons from Oklahoma Music Hall of Fame-er Tommy Crook.

== Discography ==
Record label: Turtle Music unless otherwise stated.

- Quiet Cave (2000) – UPC 660355949623
- In the Attic (2003) – CDBY 5637322310
- Peccadillos (2005) – CDBY 79894
- 1,000 Pies (2007) – UPC 837101371803
- All Fall Down (2010) – CDBY 5637682472
