= Michael Fracasso =

American singer-songwriter

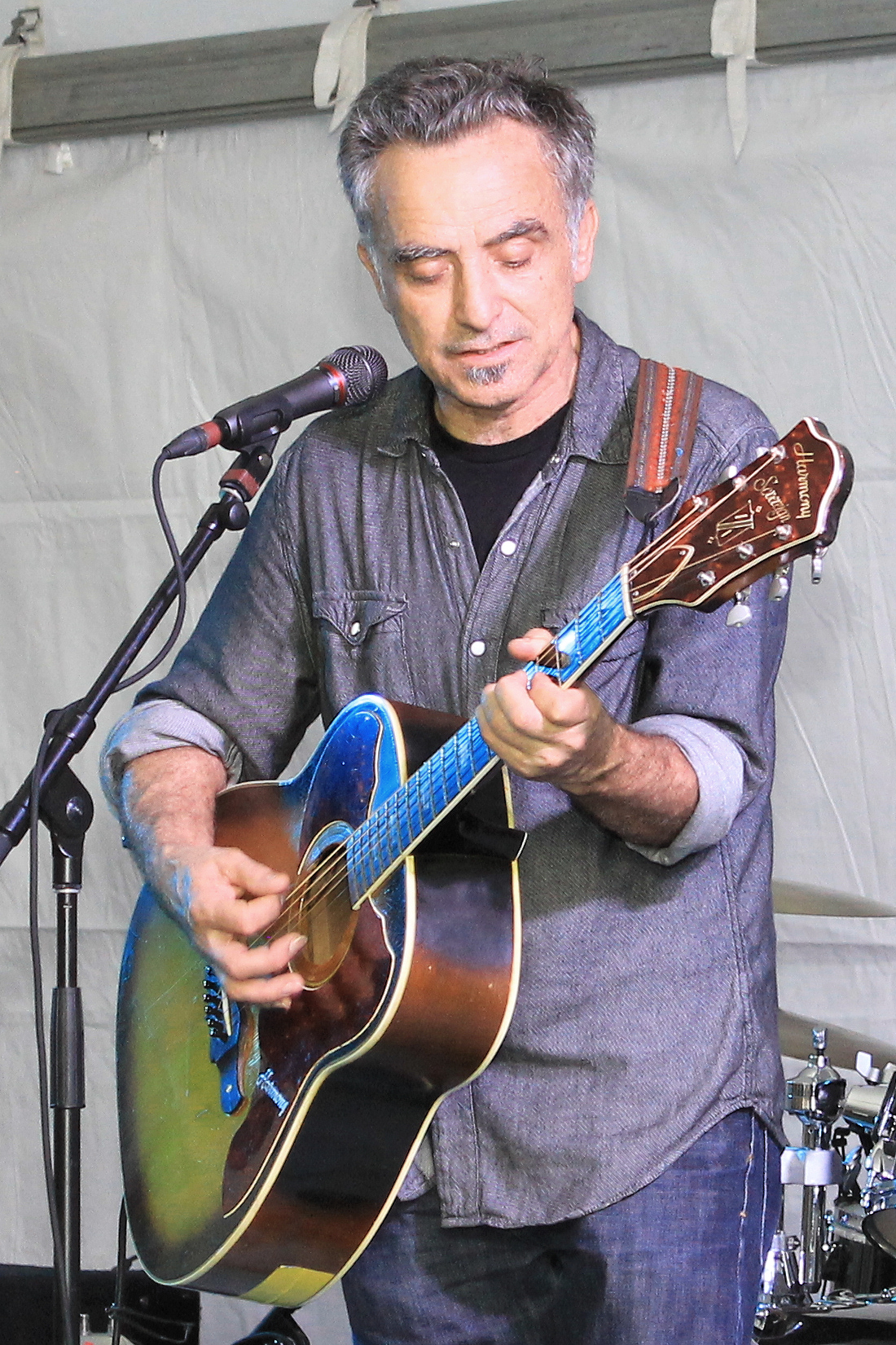
Fracasso at the 2016 Texas Book Festival

Michael Fracasso is a singer-songwriter based in Austin, Texas. His music spans country and rock as he sings in a high tenor that evokes the "high lonesome" sound of early country.

He was a regular performer at the Cornelia Street Cafe's Monday night songwriter workshops in the early 1980s. He has released six albums/CDs in the past four decades. A Pocketful of Rain, Retrospective, Back To Oklahoma, World in a Drop Of Water, When I Lived in the Wild and Love & Trust.

As Of 2008 Was Touring with the Ribbon Of Highway, Endless Skyway.. Tribute to Woody Guthrie ensemble.
