= Cotillion Ballroom =

Concert venue in Wichita, Kansas, US

The Cotillion Ballroom
- The Cotillion

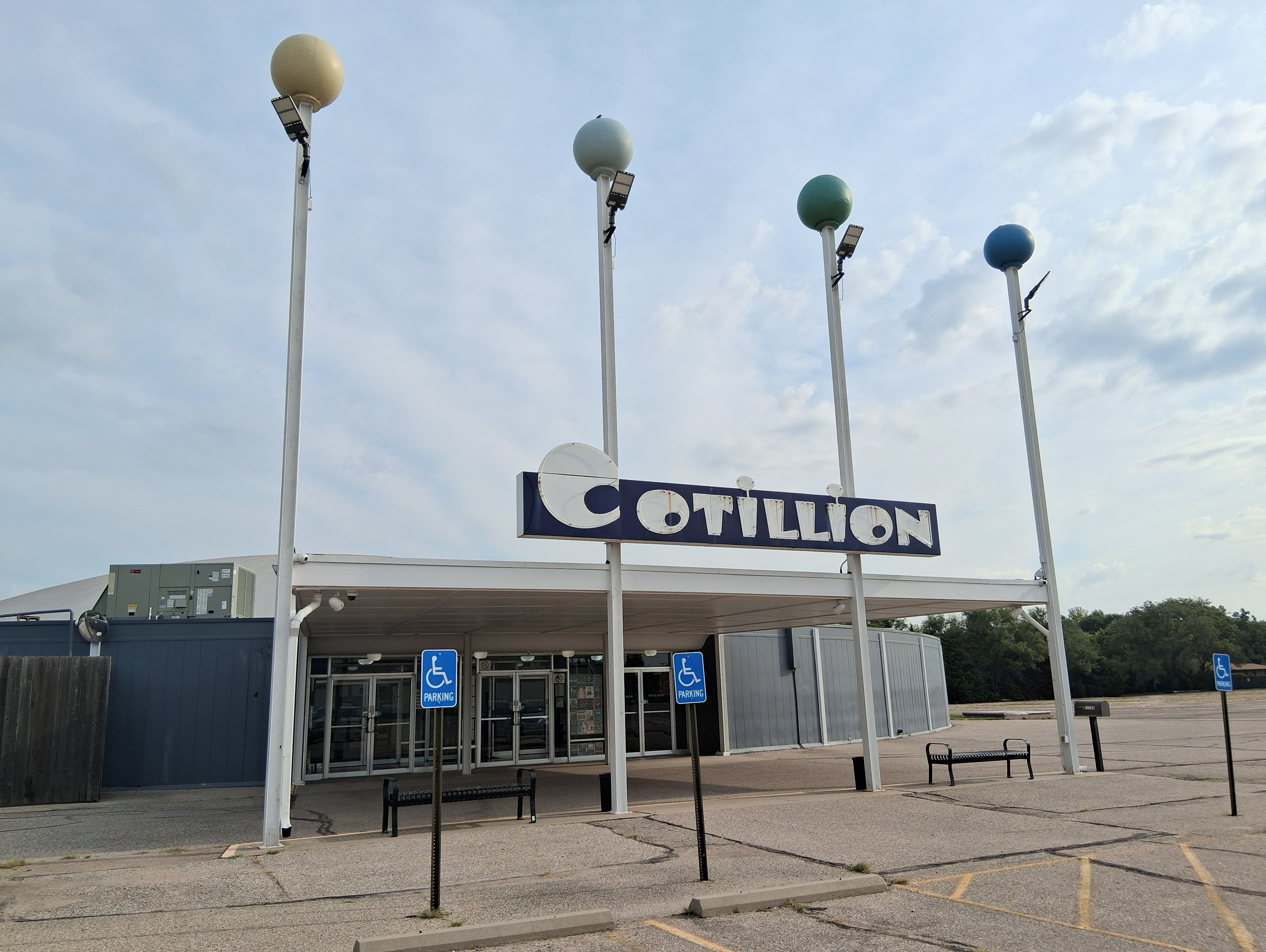
- The Cotillion Ballroom in 2026
- Interactive map of The Cotillion Ballroom
- Location: 11120 West Kellogg Dr., Wichita, Kansas 67209 USA
- Coordinates: 37.666633°N 97.471089°W
- Owner: Adam Hartke, Alex Thomas, and partners
- Capacity: 2,000

Construction
- Opened: December 7, 1960
- Architect: Robert T. Morris

Website
- thecotillion.com

The Cotillion Ballroom is a concert venue in Wichita, Kansas, United States. It is located between Maize Road and 119th Street West on the north side of Kellogg (U.S. 54) in west Wichita.

The Cotillion is a special events facility that hosts concerts, roller derby, dances, comedians and stage shows featuring nationally known artists and performers. This special events facility is available to rent for concerts, dances, banquets, corporate events, wedding receptions, trade shows and private parties.

== History ==
During the late 1950s, Wichita needed a place to go for all kinds of entertainment including concerts, dances and rental space for private functions. Built in 1960, The Cotillion is a 28,500-square-foot (2,650 m^{2}) building with a maximum concert capacity of 2,000 people. The circular design of the building has large wooden beams supporting a 24-foot (7.3 m) high domed ceiling over an 11,000-square-foot (1,000 m^{2}) floating hardwood maple dance floor and a stage that features a neon lit band shell.

In 2018, Richard and Catherine Leslie sold the Cotillion Ballroom to Adam Hartke, Alex Thomas, and some partners.

== Events ==
List of events held at the Cotillion
Artist	Event	Date	Opening Act(s)
10 Years	Cutting Like Knives Tour	September 30, 2012	The Red Jumpsuit Apparatus & thelastplaceyoulook
10 Years	2013 Tour	August 31, 2013	Seether & Eye Empire
1964 the Tribute	2000 Tour	February 28, 2000	
1964 the Tribute	2002 Tour	February 22, 2002	
1964 the Tribute	2003 Tour	January 23, 2003	
1964 the Tribute	2004 Tour	April 16, 2004	
1964 the Tribute	2005 Tour	March 18, 2005	
1964 the Tribute	2006 Tour	April 28, 2006	
1964 the Tribute	2007 Tour	September 15, 2007	
1964 the Tribute	2010 Tour	February 14, 2010	
3 Doors Down	The Better Life Tour	November 3, 2000	
30 Seconds to Mars	Forever Night, Never Day Tour	July 28, 2006	Kill Hannah, Envy on the Coast & HourCast
311	311 Tour	September 28, 1995	No Doubt
311	From Chaos Tour	April 11, 2002	Grasshopper Takeover & DJ P
311	Evolver Tour	March 8, 2004	Zack Hexum
311	Don't Tread on Me Tour	March 7, 2006	Agent Sparks
311	Summer Unity Tour	June 27, 2007	The Rivalry
311	Uplifter Tour	April 19, 2009	The Movement
.38 Special	2007 Tour	June 21, 2007	Street Survivor
80's Rock Night Concert		August 1, 2014	
80's Rock Night Concert		February 13, 2015	
Aaron Carter	After Party Tour	November 1, 2013	DJ Alex
Aaron Lewis	The Road Tour	June 20, 2013	Brian Davis & Rick Monroe
Aaron Lewis	2015 Tour	March 12, 2015	Jason Callahan Band
Aaron Tippin	In Overdrive Tour	February 15, 2010	
Aaron Watson	2015 Tour	January 16, 2015	Curtis Grimes
Adam Lambert	Glam Nation Tour	July 16, 2010	Allison Iraheta
Alice Cooper	Rock 'n' Roll Carnival Tour	October 13, 1999	
Alice in Chains	Dirt Tour	April 23, 1993	
Alice in Chains	2006 Club Tour	November 16, 2006	Hurt
The All-American Rejects	Move Along Tour	May 20, 2005	Downtown Singapore, Helvis & Crimson Addict
Alter Bridge	Blackbird Tour	October 24, 2007	Another Animal
Anberlin	Never Take Friendship Personal Tour	February 17, 2006	Hawthorne Heights, Emery, June & Bleed the Dream
Anberlin	Dark Is the Way, Light Is a Place Tour	October 21, 2011	Atomic Tom & Abandon Kansas
The Animals	Ark Reunion Tour	August 16, 1983	
Anthrax	2006 Reunion Tour	January 17, 2006	God Forbid, Sworn Enemy & Manntis
Anthrax	Worship Music Tour	October 18, 2011	Testament & Death Angel
April Wine	Attitude Tour	July 22, 1993	
April Wine	2000 Tour	February 24, 2000	Pretty Ugly
Aranda	Stop the World Tour	March 2, 2012	Taddy Porter & Barrelbright
As I Lay Dying	The Powerless Rise Tour	March 11, 2011	After the Burial & Winds of Plague
Asking Alexandria	They Don't Pray for Us Tour	April 19, 2013	Chimaira, Whitechapel, Motionless in White & I Killed the Prom Queen
Asleep at the Wheel	Take Me Back to Tulsa Tour	January 23, 2004	Danni Leigh
Asleep at the Wheel	Santa Loves to Boogie Tour	November 30, 2007	The Crawdaddies
Asleep at the Wheel	Santa Loves to Boogie Tour	December 1, 2007	The Crawdaddies
Asleep at the Wheel	It's a Good Day Tour	October 29, 2010	
Asleep at the Wheel	2012 Tour	February 10, 2012	The Crawdaddies
Asleep at the Wheel	2012 Tour	November 30, 2012	The Crawdaddies
Atmosphere	2009 Tour	August 12, 2009	Eyedea & Abilities
Atmosphere	The Family Sign Tour	July 8, 2012	Blueprint, I Self Devine & DJ Rare Groove
AWOLNATION	2013 Tour	April 5, 2013	Blondfire & Mother Mother
B.B. King	Blues 'N' Jazz Tour	November 13, 1983	
Bad English	Bad English Tour	November 17, 1990	
Banda Jerez	Esta Noche Cena Pancho Tour	March 27, 2015	Marco A Flores & Los Alteños de la Sierra
The Bellamy Brothers	Jesus is Coming Tour	May 3, 2008	
Ben Folds	Way to Normal Tour	October 25, 2009	Kate Miller-Heidke
Better Than Ezra	Before the Robots Tour	July 13, 2006	Sister Hazel
Big Head Todd and the Monsters	100 Years of Robert Johnson Tour	June 2, 2011	
Big Smo	Kuntry Livin' Tour	November 14, 2014	Haden Carpenter
Billy Bob Thornton	The Edge of the World Tour	August 17, 2003	Holly Williams
Billy Currington	Doin' Somethin' Right Tour	March 17, 2006	Brice Long
Billy Currington	Little Bit of Everything Tour	October 3, 2008	
Billy Idol	Devil's Playground Tour	May 10, 2005	
The Black Crowes	Warpaint Tour	August 13, 2008	
Black Label Society	Mafia Tour	April 24, 2005	Meldrum
Black Label Society	Order of the Black Tour	November 12, 2010	Children of Bodom, Clutch & 2Cents
Blackberry Smoke	The Whippoorwill Tour	January 23, 2013	No Justice
Blue October	Sway Tour	April 6, 2014	Architects
Blue Öyster Cult	Imaginos Tour	April 7, 1988	
Blue Öyster Cult	1991 Tour	February 1, 1991	
Blue Öyster Cult	Curse of the Hidden Mirror Tour	November 9, 2001	
Bloodhound Gang	Hooray for Boobies Tour	November 11, 1999	
Bone Thugs-n-Harmony	Thug Stories Tour	September 14, 2006	Cuete & 4Seen
Bone Thugs-n-Harmony	The Art of War: World War III Tour	July 25, 2014	
Bonham	The Disregard of Timekeeping Tour	November 29, 1990	
Brantley Gilbert	2011 Tour	July 29, 2011	Bleu Edmondson
Brave Combo	Kikiriki Tour	June 4, 2010	
Breaking Benjamin	We Are Not Alone Tour	May 17, 2005	The Exies & Silvertide
Breaking Benjamin	Phobia Tour	August 15, 2006	Dropping Daylight & Evans Blue
Brett Eldredge	Free Concert	September 18, 2013	Timmy Jonas & The Whiskey Militia
Brother in Arms	A Christian Battle of the Bands	June 22, 2014	
Buckcherry	Black Butterfly Tour	September 23, 2008	Shinedown, Saving Abel & Violence to Vegas
Buckcherry	2012 Tour	October 4, 2012	Lit & Charm City Devils
Buddy Guy	Skin Deep Tour	December 13, 2008	Tom Hambridge
Buddy Guy	Rhythm & Blues Tour	February 22, 2014	Jonny Lang
Bullet for My Valentine	Fever Tour	September 16, 2010	Escape the Fate, Black Tide & Drive A
Candlebox	2006 Reunion Tour	September 10, 2006	Driveblind & Martyr Reef
Casey Donahew Band	Moving On Tour	July 23, 2010	Jason Boyd & South 81
Casey Donahew Band	2011 Tour	April 1, 2011	Rich O'Toole
Casey Donahew Band	Double-Wide Dream Tour	January 12, 2012	JB & The Moonshine Band
Casey Donahew Band	2013 Tour	January 12, 2013	Matt Stell & The Crashers
Casey Donahew Band	StandOff Tour	January 17, 2014	JB & The Moonshine Band
Casey Donahew Band	2015 Tour	January 29, 2015	Kevin Fowler
Casey Donahew Band	2015 Tour	January 30, 2015	Kevin Fowler
Celebrando El Dia de la Independencia Concert		September 12, 2014	
Chase Rice	2013 Tour	December 12, 2013	A Thousand Horses
Chevelle	Vena Sera Tour	May 7, 2007	Finger Eleven & Strata
Chevelle	Sci-Fi Crimes Tour	November 8, 2009	Halestorm & After Midnight Project
Chevelle	2010 Tour	June 14, 2010	Papa Roach
Chevelle	Hats Off to the Bull Tour	March 13, 2012	Middle Class Rut & Janus
Chevelle	La Gárgola Tour	April 15, 2014	Middle Class Rut & Nothing More
China Mission Benefit Concert		May 15, 2005	
Chiodos	Bone Palace Ballet Tour	April 2, 2008	MxPx, Protest the Hero & The Color Fred
Chris Cagle	My Life's Been a Country Song Tour	July 18, 2008	Sundown
Chris Cagle	2013 Tour	August 9, 2013	Jake Gill
Chris LeDoux	Horsepower Tour	August 15, 2003	The Crawdaddies
Chris LeDoux	2004 Tour	July 9, 2004	Matt Engels Band
Chris Robinson Brotherhood	Big Moon Ritual Tour	August 12, 2012	
Cinderella	2010 Tour	August 20, 2010	Seasons After
Citizen Cope	2014 Tour	April 25, 2014	
Clay Walker	2010 Tour	March 4, 2010	Lee Brice
Clutch	Strange Cousins from the West Tour	May 14, 2009	Maylene and the Sons of Disaster & Wino
Clutch	2012 Tour	May 2, 2012	Hellyeah, MonstrO & Kyng
Clutch	Earth Rocker Tour	November 15, 2013	The Sword & American Sharks
Coal Chamber	Livin la Vida Loco Tour	October 20, 1999	Slipknot
Coal Chamber	2015 Tour	March 17, 2015	American Head Charge, Filter, Combichrist & Saint Ridley
Collective Soul	Dosage Tour	May 2, 1999	Marvelous 3
Collective Soul	Collective Soul Tour	June 30, 2009	Gavin DeGraw & Green River Ordinance
Colt Ford	Chicken & Biscuits Tour	August 21, 2010	
Colt Ford	Declaration of Independence Tour	June 8, 2012	JB & The Moonshine Band, The Lacs & Lenny Cooper
Corey Smith	The Broken Record Tour	November 12, 2011	Jason Boyd Band
Corey Smith	2012 Tour	October 26, 2012	Sam Sliva & The Good
Craig Morgan	Little Bit of Life Tour	October 6, 2006	
Creed	My Own Prison Tour	September 3, 1998	Fuel
Cross Canadian Ragweed	Garage Tour	December 16, 2005	Stoney LaRue
Cross Canadian Ragweed	2006 Tour	September 28, 2006	Stoney LaRue
Cross Canadian Ragweed	Mission California Tour	December 6, 2007	Back Porch Mary
Cross Canadian Ragweed	2009 Tour	January 2, 2009	Wade Bowen
Cross Canadian Ragweed	2009 Tour	May 21, 2009	Seth James Band
Cross Canadian Ragweed	Happiness and All the Other Things Tour	April 15, 2010	Micky & the Motorcars
Crystal Gayle	2009 Tour	August 28, 2009	
Dan Fogelberg	1997 Tour	October 19, 1997	
Daughtry	Daughtry Tour	August 27, 2007	Small Town Sleeper
David Cook	The Declaration Tour	June 21, 2009	Ryan Star
David Nail	I'm a Fire Tour	October 9, 2014	Native Run
David Sanborn	2012 Tour	June 24, 2012	
DC Talk	Jesus Freak Tour	April 17, 1996	
Deftones	Saturday Night Wrist Tour	June 20, 2007	The Fall of Troy & Dir En Grey
Delbert McClinton	2000 Tour	February 4, 2000	
Delbert McClinton	Room to Breathe Tour	February 14, 2003	Mark Selby
Delbert McClinton	2004 Tour	February 14, 2004	Teresa James
Delbert McClinton	Cost of Living Tour	February 12, 2005	Jimmie Lewin & The Kingtones
Delbert McClinton	Acquired Taste Tour	June 11, 2010	
Delbert McClinton	Acquired Taste Tour	October 2, 2010	
The Departed	2011 Tour	April 8, 2011	Sons of Bill
The Departed	Adventūs Tour	February 15, 2013	John D. Hale Band
The Departed	2014 Tour	February 20, 2014	JJ Grey & MOFRO
Dickey Betts & Great Southern	2004 Tour	September 24, 2004	
Dierks Bentley	High Times & Hangovers Tour	December 2, 2004	Cross Canadian Ragweed
Disturbed	The Sickness Tour	March 21, 2001	Godsmack, Spineshank & Skrape
Disturbed	Ten Thousand Fists Tour	August 23, 2005	10 Years & Ill Niño
Disturbed	Indestructible Tour	April 27, 2008	Five Finger Death Punch & Art of Dying
Don Williams	2003 Tour	August 8, 2003	
Don Williams	My Heart to You Tour	April 14, 2005	
Dr. John	Sippiana Hericane Tour	February 24, 2006	
Dream Theater	Music in Progress Tour	June 17, 1993	Galactic Cowboys
Drowning Pool	Desensitized Tour	June 10, 2005	Dry Kill Logic & Opiate for the Masses
Dustin Lynch	Dustin Lynch Tour	November 23, 2012	Shawna Russell
Dustin Lynch	Where It's At Tour	February 27, 2015	Adam Capps & The Dirt Road Drifters
Duke Ellington Orchestra	1966 Tour	May 6, 1966	
Earl Scruggs	3 Pickers Tour	August 7, 2003	Mountain Heart
Easton Corbin	Easton Corbin Tour	March 19, 2011	
Edgar Winter Band	Rebel Road Tour	November 13, 2008	Terry Quiett Band
¡El Baile De Los Enamorados! Concert		February 14, 2015	
Eli Young Band	2010 Tour	October 30, 2010	
Eli Young Band	2011 Tour	April 21, 2011	Kevin Fowler
Eli Young Band	Life at Best Tour	February 17, 2012	Eric Paslay
Eli Young Band	10,000 Towns Tour	September 10, 2014	Mountain Deer Revival & Rick Monroe
Elliott Yamin	It's Better Live Tour	May 4, 2013	Sonia Rao & Mycle Wastman
Emmylou Harris	Wrecking Ball Tour	July 17, 1997	
Etta James & The Roots Band	Let's Roll Tour	May 11, 2003	
Evanescence	Fallen Tour	February 18, 2004	Default & Atomship
Everclear	Learning How to Smile Tour	July 4, 2001	The Mayfield Four, American Hi-Fi & Flipp
The Fabulous Thunderbirds	On the Verge Tour	June 21, 2013	Popa Chubby
Filter	The Sun Comes Out Tonight Tour	November 6, 2013	Fight or Flight, Nothing More & Barrelbright
Five Finger Death Punch	American Capitalist Tour	May 9, 2012	Trivium & In This Moment
Flicker Lounge 80's Band Reunion Bash		August 22, 2009	
Flyleaf	Unite & Fight Tour	October 1, 2010	Story of the Year
Foghat	Zig-Zag Walk Tour	April 26, 1984	
Foo Fighters	Foo Fighters Tour	April 21, 1996	Ween & Jawbreaker
Fuel	Something Like Human Tour	May 23, 2001	Puddle of Mudd
GAC Christmas Tour		November 30, 2006	
Gary Allan	See If I Care Tour	November 1, 2003	Jason Boland & The Stragglers
Gary Allan	2004 Tour	November 12, 2004	Jedd Hughes
Gary Allan	2011 Tour	November 19, 2011	Joe Worrel
Gene Watson	In a Perfect World Tour	December 5, 2008	
George Jones	The Rock: Stone Cold Country Tour	March 22, 2002	Elbert West
George Thorogood & The Destroyers	Ride 'Til I Die Tour	July 1, 2003	
George Thorogood & The Destroyers	2008 Tour	March 6, 2008	Monkey Beat
Girls Gone Wild Rocks America Tour		March 12, 2006	
Godsmack	2000 Tour	May 17, 2000	Pretty Ugly
Gordon Lightfoot	2010 Tour	August 15, 2010	
Gov't Mule	Déjà Voodoo Tour	February 10, 2005	
Gov't Mule	High & Mighty Tour	May 1, 2007	
Grace Potter and the Nocturnals	The Lion the Beast the Beat Tour	July 25, 2012	Natalie Prass
The Grascals	The Famous Lefty Flynn's Tour	May 9, 2010	
Gwar	Lust in Space Tour	October 8, 2009	Lamb of God & Job for a Cowboy
Hank & Phil Anniversary Show		September 16, 2006	
Hanson	Walk Around The World Tour	November 7, 2008	Matt Wertz & Everybody Else
Hatebreed	The Divinity of Purpose Tour	February 6, 2013	Shadows Fall, Dying Fetus, The Contortionist & Continent of Ash
The Haunted Windchimes	2014 Tour	June 6, 2014	Calamity Cubes
Hellyeah	Hellyeah Tour	June 1, 2007	Soil & Continent of Ash
Hellyeah	Hellyeah Tour	December 14, 2007	Bloodsimple & Otep
Hellyeah	Blood for Blood Tour	February 15, 2015	Like a Storm, Devour the Day & Archer
Henry Rollins	Spoken Word Guy Tour	June 27, 2010	
Here Come the Mummies	Bed, Bath & Behind Tour	December 9, 2011	Big Hat Fun
Here Come the Mummies	Cryptic Tour	March 15, 2013	The Soul Project
Here Come the Mummies	Pull It Off Tour	August 15, 2014	Jared Mitchell
Hinder	2007 Tour	January 25, 2007	Finger Eleven & Black Stone Cherry
Hinder	2011 Tour	August 2, 2011	Adelitas Way, Egypt Central & 9 Left Dead
Hinder	Welcome to the Freakshow Tour	August 15, 2013	Devour the Day & Acidic
Insane Clown Posse	Bizaar Bizzar Tour	May 25, 2001	Marz & Blaze
Insane Clown Posse	Hell's Pit Tour	November 21, 2004	Mack 10, Anybody Killa & Esham
Insane Clown Posse	The Tempest Tour	May 3, 2007	Twiztid & X Clan
Insane Clown Posse	Bang! Pow! Boom! Tour	November 7, 2009	Hed PE
Insane Clown Posse	2010 Tour	October 12, 2010	The Dayton Family & Axe Murder Boyz
Intocable	2012 Tour	October 5, 2012	Chicos de Barrio
J. Cole	2014 Forest Hills Drive Tour	March 15, 2015	Bas, Cozz & Omen
Jack's Mannequin	2011 Tour	June 21, 2011	Steel Train & Lady Danville
JB and the Moonshine Band	Beer for Breakfast Tour	October 6, 2012	Jared Daniels Band
Jackyl	Push Comes to Shove Tour	September 2, 1994	
Jackyl	When Moonshine and Dynamite Collide Tour	June 3, 2010	
Jackyl	2011 Tour	October 29, 2011	Firststryke
Jackyl	Best in Show Tour	November 3, 2012	Dead Friend Walking
Jackyl	2013 Tour	November 22, 2013	Nigel Dupree Band & Shyner
Jackyl	2014 Tour	November 15, 2014	Joe Durt
Jägermeister Country Tour		March 26, 2010	
Jägermeister Music Tour		June 11, 2006	
Jägermeister Music Tour		November 30, 2008	
Jaheim	Ghetto Love Tour	May 15, 2002	Amanda Perez
James Brown	Bring It On Tour	October 12, 1984	
James Otto	Sunset Man Tour	September 19, 2008	WC Edgar
Jamey Johnson	That Lonesome Song Tour	March 27, 2009	Bart Crow Band
Jamey Johnson	That Lonesome Song Tour	July 2, 2009	
Jamey Johnson	2010 Tour	August 6, 2010	
Jamey Johnson	Living for a Song Tour	February 22, 2013	Chris Hennessee
Jamey Johnson	2014 Tour	May 23, 2014	Chris Hennessee
Janis Joplin & The Kozmic Blues Band	I Got Dem Ol' Kozmic Blues Again Mama! Tour	October 24, 1969	James Cotton Blues Band
Jason Aldean	2007 Tour	January 12, 2007	Gary Nichols
Jason Aldean	Relentless Tour	January 18, 2008	No Justice
Jason Boland & The Stragglers	2006 Tour	March 3, 2006	No Justice
Jason Boland & The Stragglers	The Bourbon Legend Tour	November 24, 2006	
Jason Boland & The Stragglers	2007 Tour	March 16, 2007	Mike Love Band
Jason Boland & The Stragglers	2008 Tour	January 12, 2008	South 40
Jason Boland & The Stragglers	Comal County Blue Tour	August 29, 2008	
Jason Boland & The Stragglers	Comal County Blue Tour	December 26, 2008	Jackson Taylor & The Sinners
Jason Boland & The Stragglers	2009 Tour	July 31, 2009	John D. Hale Band
Jason Boland & The Stragglers	2010 Tour	February 12, 2010	Rich O'Toole
Jason Boland & The Stragglers	2010 Tour	May 21, 2010	John D. Hale Band
Jason Boland & The Stragglers	2010 Tour	November 27, 2010	Turnpike Troubadours
Jason Boland & The Stragglers	2011 Tour	March 26, 2011	Matt Stell & The Crashers
Jason Boland & The Stragglers	Rancho Alto Tour	February 24, 2012	Turnpike Troubadours & The Dirty River Boys
Jason Boland & The Stragglers	Rancho Alto Tour	November 21, 2012	Turnpike Troubadours
Jason Boland & The Stragglers	Dark & Dirty Mile Tour	November 27, 2013	Jason Callahan Band & Six Market Blvd.
Jason Boland & The Stragglers	2014 Tour	December 27, 2014	Jonny Burke
Jason Michael Carroll	Waitin' in the Country Tour	November 29, 2007	Cole Deggs & the Lonesome
Jeezy	Seen It All: The Autobiography Tour	November 16, 2014	Big Boyz & Dusty Leigh
Jerrod Niemann	Judge Jerrod & the Hung Jury Tour	December 10, 2010	Sunny Sweeney
Jerrod Niemann	2011 Tour	December 8, 2011	Tyler Farr
Jerry Lee Lewis	2003 Tour	February 7, 2003	
Jesse McCartney	Beautiful Soul Tour	August 18, 2005	Hope Partlow
Jim Stafford	2013 Tour	January 18, 2013	
Jimmie Vaughan & The Tilt–A–Whirl Band	Plays Blues, Ballads & Favorites Tour	March 30, 2011	Moreland & Arbuckle
Jimmy Eat World	Damage Tour	May 21, 2014	Stagnant Pools
Joan Armatrading	This Charming Life Tour	July 30, 2010	
Joe Bonamassa	So, It's Like That Tour	October 2, 2002	Lost Dogs & Piper Leigh
Joe Bonamassa	Sloe Gin Tour	November 8, 2007	Crosby Loggins & The Light
Joe Cocker	Respect Yourself Tour	April 17, 2003	Elliot Threatt
Joe Walsh	Ordinary Average Guy Tour	May 19, 1991	
JoJo	Mad Love Tour	April 18, 2017	Stanaj
John Hiatt	Mystic Pinball Tour	September 10, 2012	Curtis Salgado
John Lee Hooker	1985 Tour	August 9, 1985	
Johnny Cash	Happiness Is You Tour	February 24, 1967	
Johnny Cash	From Sea to Shining Sea Tour	March 15, 1968	
Johnny Rivers	2000 Tour	March 24, 2000	
Jonny Lang	Wander This World Tour	November 11, 1999	Nina Storey
Jonny Lang	Long Time Coming Tour	November 11, 2003	Indigenous
Josh Abbott Band	She's Like Texas Tour	January 7, 2011	
Josh Abbott Band	Small Town Family Dream Tour	August 23, 2013	Weston Burt
Josh Abbott Band	2014 Tour	July 18, 2014	Mountain Deer Revival
Josh Gracin	We Weren't Crazy Tour	February 14, 2008	LoCash Cowboys
Josh Turner	Your Man Tour	August 11, 2006	Dave Holland Band
Juicy J	Stay Trippy Tour	June 20, 2014	Bill Niels, P. Muna, Big Boyz & CMAJOR
Junior Brown	2013 Tour	August 10, 2013	Jason Callahan Band
Justin Moore	Outlaws Like Me Tour	March 1, 2012	Turnback Creek
Kansas Food Bank & Drive Concert		November 29, 2014	
Kansas Humane Society Benefit Concert		August 22, 2013	
Kansas Humane Society Benefit Concert		August 10, 2014	
Keith Anderson	C'mon! Tour	November 15, 2008	
Keith Sweat	Just Me Tour	November 14, 2008	
Kenny Wayne Shepherd	The Place You're In Tour	March 9, 2005	
Kenny Wayne Shepherd	10 Days Out: Blues from the Backroads Tour	April 5, 2007	
Kevin Fowler	2009 Tour	August 7, 2009	Eli Young Band
Kevin Fowler	2011 Tour	March 21, 2011	
Kevin Fowler	Chippin' Away Tour	March 10, 2012	Candy Coburn & Jason Boyd Band
Kevin Fowler	2013 Tour	March 30, 2013	Haywired
Kevin Gates	Luca Brasi 2 Tour	February 26, 2015	
KICT T-95	Not So Silent Night Show	December 14, 2004	
KICT T-95	Not So Silent Night Show	December 5, 2009	
KICT T-95	Not So Silent Night Show	December 9, 2010	
KICT T-95	Not So Silent Night Show	December 14, 2011	
KICT T-95	Not So Silent Night Show	December 8, 2012	
KICT T-95	Not So Silent Night Show	December 6, 2013	
The Killers	Hot Fuss Tour	August 13, 2005	Richard Johnston
Killswitch Engage	2008 Tour	January 24, 2008	The Dillinger Escape Plan, Every Time I Die & Parkway Drive
Killswitch Engage	Disarm the Descent Tour	July 3, 2013	Darkest Hour, Miss May I, The Word Alive & Affiance
KoЯn	Ballroom Blitz Tour	May 28, 2010	2Cents
Kottonmouth Kings	Koast II Koast Tour	August 12, 2006	Hed PE & Potluck
Kottonmouth Kings	Cloud Nine Tour	August 23, 2007	Tech N9ne, Blaze Ya Dead Homie & Subnoize Souljaz
Kottonmouth Kings	Strange Noize Tour	August 31, 2008	Tech N9ne, Hed PE, Brother J, Sen Dog & Prozak
Kottonmouth Kings	The Green Album Tour	April 2, 2009	La Coka Nostra, Blaze Ya Dead Homie & Big B
Kottonmouth Kings	Long Live The Kings Tour	September 1, 2010	Authority Zero & Big B
Krokus	One Vice at a Time Tour	May 6, 1982	
KSOK 95.9	65th Birthday Bash	August 18, 2012	
KTHR 107.3 The Brew	Birthday Bash	June 22, 2000	
KVWF 100.5 The Wolf	5th Anniversary Party	March 20, 2013	
The Lacs	190 Proof Tour	November 16, 2012	Slippin Sideways & Trent Crisswell Band
The Lacs		January 11, 2014	
The Lacs	Outlaw In Me Tour	February 20, 2015	Haywired
The Lacs	Out Here Tour	February 12, 2016	Moonshine Bandits
The Lacs	American Rebelution Tour	March 17, 2017	3 and Twenty
The Lacs	Dirt Rock Tour	March 2, 2018	
The Lacs	Made in America Tour	February 22, 2019	
The Lacs	Rise and Shine Tour	March 6, 2020	
Lamb of God	Sacrament Tour	July 29, 2007	Hatebreed & 3 Inches of Blood
Lamb of God	2013 Tour	June 9, 2013	Decapitated & Anciients
Legendary Rhythm & Blues Revue Tour		May 2, 2007	
LFO	LFO Tour	May 19, 2000	
Lifehouse	Who We Are Tour	October 31, 2007	The Midway State
Little Feat	Let It Roll Tour	April 6, 1989	Ivan Neville
Little River Band	Where We Started From Tour	June 29, 2001	
Little River Band	Re-Arranged Tour	June 1, 2006	Crazy Heart
Little Texas	2010 Tour	June 14, 2010	Jason Boyd & South 81
Live	The Distance to Here Tour	May 9, 2000	Tracy Bonham & Local H
LoCash Cowboys	LoCash Cowboys Tour	November 21, 2014	6 Degrees West
Louis Armstrong	Hello, Dolly! Tour	February 17, 1964	
Machine Gun Kelly	2014 Tour	October 17, 2014	Dusty Leigh
Marcia Ball	2007 Tour	September 14, 2007	
Marilyn Manson	Dead to the World Tour	January 8, 1997	L7
Mark Chesnutt	Outlaw Tour	July 15, 2010	
The Marshall Tucker Band	Beyond the Horizon Tour	May 13, 2005	Winters Bros. Band & Curtis Moore Band
The Marshall Tucker Band	2009 Tour	September 26, 2009	Candy Coburn
The Marshall Tucker Band	2013 Tour	September 27, 2013	Live Wire
¡Mayday! & Murs	¡MursDay! Tour	December 4, 2014	Ces Cru, Big Boyz, Kap Kallous & All Natty
Megadeth	Countdown to Extinction Tour	February 7, 1993	Stone Temple Pilots
Megadeth	Cryptic Writings Tour	January 5, 1998	
Megadeth	Risk Tour	October 31, 1999	Static-X & Loudmouth
Merle Haggard & The Strangers	The Peer Sessions Tour	April 30, 2003	Freddy Powers
Merle Haggard & The Strangers	The Bluegrass Sessions Tour	August 16, 2007	Joe Worrell
Merle Haggard & The Strangers	2008 Tour	July 2, 2008	Matt Engels Band
Micky & the Motorcars	Hearts From Above Tour	February 28, 2015	Jason Boyd Band & The Plainsmen
Mike McClure Band	2010 Tour	January 15, 2010	Red Dirt Rangers
Mike Morgan & The Crawl	Free Ourselves Tour	January 20, 2006	Made From Scratch
Mindless Self Indulgence	If Tour	June 10, 2008	The Birthday Massacre & Tub Ring
Miranda Lambert	2008 Tour	March 13, 2008	Adam Hood
Missouri	Welcome 2 Missouri Tour	September 11, 1979	
Molly Hatchet	Molly Hatchet Tour	April 3, 1979	
The Monkees	20th Anniversary Tour	June 17, 1986	Herman's Hermits, The Grass Roots & Gary Puckett & The Union Gap
Moonshine Bandits	Rebels on the Run Tour	January 23, 2015	Big B & Demun Jones
Moreland and Arbuckle	Just a Dream Tour	September 30, 2011	The Sluggos
Moreland and Arbuckle	2012 Tour	March 17, 2012	Scroat Belly
Motörhead	Snake Bite Love Tour	October 7, 1999	
Muddy Waters	King Bee Tour	September 24, 1981	
Mudvayne	Masters of Horror Tour	December 9, 2005	Sevendust, 10 Years & Bobaflex
Mudvayne	The New Game Tour	November 24, 2008	10 Years & Snot
Murderdolls	Women and Children Last Tour	December 22, 2010	Vampires Everywhere! & Get Scared
Mushroomhead	2013 Tour	February 13, 2013	Final Trigger, Gemini Syndrome & Society's Plague
Music for Life Benefit Concert		May 30, 2014	
MySpace Music Tour		October 21, 2007	
Neal McCoy	2007 Tour	August 10, 2007	Joe Worrell
NEEDTOBREATHE	The Reckoning Tour	September 23, 2011	Clarensau
New Year's Eve Jam		December 31, 2012	
New Year's Eve Jam		December 31, 2013	
New Year's Eve Jam		December 31, 2014	
Newsboys	Going Public Tour	April 9, 1995	Audio Adrenaline & Tony Vincent
Nitty Gritty Dirt Band	Speed of Life Tour	February 28, 2010	The Trishas
Nonpoint	The Return Tour	November 22, 2014	Gemini Syndrome, Islander & 3 Years Hollow
Old Crow Medicine Show	2011 Tour	June 16, 2011	
Old Crow Medicine Show	2013 Tour	June 24, 2013	Parker Millsap
One Night of Queen	2010 Tour	March 6, 2010	
Otep	Seduce & Destroy Tour	March 14, 2013	One-Eyed Doll, Picture Me Broken & Apparition
P.O.D.	Testify Tour	November 29, 2005	Cold & Fivespeed
Papa Roach	Getting Away with Murder Tour	November 4, 2004	Trust Company & Chronic Future
Papa Roach	The Connection Tour	January 31, 2013	Otherwise & Kingshifter
Pat Benatar	Summer Vacation Tour	August 26, 2001	Sandra Lavon
Pat Green	Lucky Ones Tour	May 5, 2005	Wade Bowen
Pat Green	2006 Tour	April 14, 2006	Shaking Tree
Pat Green	Cannonball Tour	April 27, 2007	Mike Love Band
Pat Green	What I'm For Tour	April 30, 2010	Jason Boyd & South 81
Patrulla 81	Cómo Pude Enamorarme de Ti Tour	March 10, 2006	
Paul Wall	2008 Tour	May 15, 2008	Tech N9ne & Ill Bill
Paul Wall	Fast Life Tour	December 19, 2008	Critical Bill
Phil Vassar	2014 Tour	February 6, 2014	Jake Gill
Phil Vassar	2014 Tour	May 1, 2014	Jake Gill
Pillar	Where Do We Go from Here Tour	September 9, 2004	
The Pink Floyd Experience	2011 Tour	March 23, 2011	
The Pink Floyd Experience	2014 Tour	March 12, 2014	
Primus	Antipop Tour	November 26, 1999	Buckethead & Incubus
Primus	3D Tour	November 4, 2012	
Puddle of Mudd	Songs in the Key of Love & Hate Tour	April 14, 2010	Saliva, Burn Halo & The Veer Union
Quarterflash	Quarterflash Tour	March 11, 1982	Tommy Tutone
Queensrÿche	Tribe Tour	October 2, 2003	
Queensrÿche featuring Geoff Tate	Farewell Tour	August 28, 2014	The Voodoos
Randy Rogers Band	Randy Rogers Band Tour	May 1, 2009	Jonathan Tyler and the Northern Lights
Randy Rogers Band	2012 Tour	January 27, 2012	Sam Sliva & The Good
Randy Rogers Band	2013 Tour	February 8, 2013	Shawna Russell
Ratt	Out of the Cellar Tour	August 26, 1984	Mama's Boys
Ratt	Infestation Tour	May 16, 2010	
Ratt	2013 Tour	July 19, 2013	Shyner
Ray Price	2008 Tour	April 18, 2008	
Reckless Kelly	Somewhere in Time Tour	March 19, 2010	Back Porch Mary
Reckless Kelly	Good Luck & True Love Tour	October 15, 2011	Mando Saenz
Reckless Kelly	2012 Tour	June 9, 2012	Jared Daniels Band
Reckless Kelly	Long Night Moon Tour	November 9, 2013	Matt Skinner Band
Red	REDvolution Tour	March 21, 2012	Thousand Foot Krutch, Manafest, Nine Lashes & Kiros
The Red Jumpsuit Apparatus	Don't You Fake It Tour	April 23, 2007	So They Say
The Red Jumpsuit Apparatus	Don't You Fake It Tour	October 30, 2007	Hawthorne Heights, Amber Pacific, New Years Day & Monty Are I
Rehab	Farewell Tour	March 17, 2014	Angels Cut & Big Boyz
REO Speedwagon	Building the Bridge Tour	October 1, 1996	
REO Speedwagon	1998 Tour	June 23, 1998	
The Reverend Horton Heat	2007 Tour	August 17, 2007	Murder by Death
The Reverend Horton Heat	2008 Tour	December 12, 2008	Backyard Tire Fire
The Reverend Horton Heat	2009 Tour	May 7, 2009	Split Lip Rayfield & Dirtfoot
Riff Raff	JODYHiGHROLLER.COM Tour	February 10, 2015	Chanel West Coast & Buckhead
Robert Cray Band	Shoulda Been Home Tour	October 7, 2001	Clarence Brewer
Robin Trower Band	1985 Tour	November 7, 1985	
Rodney Atkins	If You're Going Through Hell Tour	March 9, 2007	Blue County
Rodney Carrington	Morning Wood Tour	March 30, 2001	Barry Martin
Ronnie Milsap	Just for a Thrill Tour	October 15, 2004	Matt Engels Band
Royal Southern Brotherhood	2014 Tour	April 3, 2014	Rachelle Coba Band
RTB Cancer Fund Benefit Concert		August 5, 2011	
Saliva	Every Six Seconds Tour	April 23, 2001	Crazy Town & Stereomud
Saliva	Blood Stained Love Story Tour	February 9, 2007	Crossfade
Saliva	Blood Stained Love Story Tour	November 11, 2007	Puddle of Mudd & Deepfield
Saliva	Under Your Skin Tour	July 20, 2011	Filter & Anew Revolution
Santana	Spirits Dancing in the Flesh Tour	October 18, 1990	
Saving Abel	Miss America Tour	July 2, 2010	American Bang, We Are the Fallen & Taddy Porter
Scream It Like You Mean It Festival		August 1, 2012	
The Schwag	2008 Tour	August 2, 2008	Moonlight Drive
Seasons After	Calamity, Scars & Memoirs Release Concert	September 26, 2014	Continent of Ash, Kingshifter & Empire Falling
Section 25	From the Hip Tour	February 2, 1985	
Seether	Karma and Effect Tour	August 16, 2005	Crossfade & Dark New Day
Seether	Finding Beauty in Negative Spaces Tour	August 3, 2008	Finger Eleven & Red
Seether	Isolate and Medicate Tour	February 2, 2015	Papa Roach, Kyng & Islander
Sepultura	New Titans on the Block Tour	August 19, 1991	Sick of It All, Sacred Reich & Napalm Death
Sevendust	Seasons Tour	January 28, 2004	Ill Niño & Element Eighty
Sevendust	Alpha Tour	July 1, 2007	Diecast & Operator
Sevendust	Cold Day Memory Tour	February 27, 2010	Drowning Pool & Digital Summer
Sevendust	2013 Tour	April 3, 2013	Lacuna Coil, Coal Chamber & Candlelight Red
Sevendust	Time Travelers & Bonfires Tour	August 17, 2014	Gemini Syndrome, Monks of Mellonwah & Sidewise
Shinedown	Us & Them Tour	January 27, 2006	
Shinedown	Us & Them Tour	October 5, 2006	Shaman's Harvest, Continent of Ash & Matt Engels Band
Shinedown	2007 Tour	August 27, 2007	Operator & Deepfield
Shinedown	2009 Tour	May 27, 2009	Saving Abel & Halestorm
Shooter Jennings	Family Man Tour	March 24, 2012	The Departed & Uncle Lucius
Sick Puppies	Connect Tour	August 6, 2014	Like a Storm & Stars in Stereo
Skid Row	Subhuman Race Tour	May 19, 1995	
Slash	We're All Gonna Die Tour	January 21, 2011	Taddy Porter
Slayer	South of Heaven Tour	November 22, 1988	Motörhead & Overkill
Slayer	Divine Intervention Tour	January 31, 1995	Machine Head
Slightly Stoopid	2011 Tour	May 12, 2011	Dumpstaphunk
Slipknot	World Domination Tour	April 24, 2000	Mudvayne & Ultraspank
SnoCore Tour		February 8, 2005	
SnoCore Tour		January 27, 2006	
Snoop Dogg	Doggumentary Tour	February 3, 2011	
Snoop Dogg	2014 Tour	February 23, 2014	
Sounds of the 60's Concert		June 3, 2005	
Split Lip Rayfield	2006 Tour	August 20, 2006	Drakkar Sauna & Barney Byard
Split Lip Rayfield	2006 Tour	December 8, 2006	White Ghost Shivers
Split Lip Rayfield	I'll Be Around Tour	December 28, 2007	Dirtfoot & Truckstop Honeymoon
Split Lip Rayfield	2009 Tour	January 23, 2009	
Split Lip Rayfield	2011 Tour	January 8, 2011	Dirtfoot & Mountain Sprout
Split Lip Rayfield	2012 Tour	January 13, 2012	Dirtfoot & Mountain Sprout
Split Lip Rayfield	2015 Tour	January 24, 2015	Cowgirl's Train Set & Tom Page Trio
Spyro Gyra	In Modern Times Tour	February 14, 2002	4 Brothers
Staind	Break the Cycle Tour	July 3, 2001	Cold & Puddle of Mudd
Staind	14 Shades of Grey Tour	October 19, 2004	Kaotic Circle
Steel Panther	All You Can Eat Tour	May 8, 2014	Future Villains
Steel Panther	Heavy Metal Rules Tour	June 4, 2021	
Stevie Ray Vaughan & Double Trouble	Soul to Soul Tour	April 25, 1985	Lonnie Mack
Stone Sour	Stone Sour Tour	May 6, 2003	Powerman 5000, Ra & Outspoken
Stoney LaRue	2008 Tour	May 17, 2008	Jonathan Tyler & The Northern Lights
Stoney LaRue	2013 Tour	March 8, 2013	Whiskey Myers
Stoney LaRue	2014 Tour	March 21, 2014	Jody Schmidt Band & Midnight River Choir
Stoney LaRue	2014 Tour	August 22, 2014	Thieving Birds
Story of the Year	In the Wake of Determination Tour	September 22, 2005	Anberlin, Funeral for a Friend & He Is Legend
Story of the Year	The Black Swan Tour	April 11, 2008	Madina Lake & Josephine Collective
Superchick	Cross the Line Tour	May 10, 2008	Disciple, KJ-52 & Britt Nicole
System of a Down	2000 Tour	July 11, 2000	Fragile Porcelain Mice & Dead O
T. G. Sheppard	2008 Tour	August 1, 2008	
Tab Benoit	Night Train to Nashville Tour	April 17, 2009	
Tab Benoit	2010 Tour	March 20, 2010	
Taj Mahal	Hanapepe Dream Tour	April 30, 2002	
Tech N9ne	Killer Tour	November 20, 2008	Krizz Kaliko, Prozak, Kutt Calhoun, Skatterman & Snug Brim & Grave Plott
Tech N9ne	K.O.D. Tour	October 31, 2009	Krizz Kaliko, Kutt Calhoun, Slaughterhouse, Big Scoob, Stevie Stone & Glasses Malone
Tech N9ne	Independent Grind Tour	October 31, 2010	E-40, Krizz Kaliko, Kutt Calhoun, Big Scoob & Glasses Malone
Tech N9ne	All 6's and 7's Tour	June 8, 2011	Krizz Kaliko, Kutt Calhoun, Jay Rock, Big Scoob, ¡Mayday! & Stevie Stone
Tech N9ne	Hostile Takeover Tour	March 25, 2012	Krizz Kaliko, Prozak, ¡Mayday!, Stevie Stone & Machine Gun Kelly
Tech N9ne	Something Else Tour	September 6, 2013	Krizz Kaliko, Stevie Stone, ¡Mayday!, Prozak, Ces Cru & Big Boyz
Tech N9ne	Independent Grind Tour	June 25, 2014	Krizz Kaliko, Jarren Benton, Freddie Gibbs, Psych Ward Druggies & Big Boyz
Tech N9ne	Strangeulation Tour	December 13, 2014	Krizz Kaliko, Stevie Stone, Big Boyz, All Natty & Ya Boi Drama
Ted Nugent	Unleash the Beast Tour	August 13, 2006	Huck Johns
Ted Nugent	Unleash The Nuge Beast Killer Rock Tour	June 5, 2007	Crooked X
Ted Weems Orchestra	Grand Opening Concert	December 7, 1960	
Tedeschi Trucks Band	Revelator Tour	August 28, 2011	
The Temptations	Reflections Tour	October 24, 2006	
Terry Quiett Band	Taking Sides Tour	March 7, 2015	Levee Town & Quiett and Walker
Tesla	Bust a Nut Tour	June 12, 1995	
Tesla	Bust a Nut Tour	March 22, 1996	
Tesla	5-Man Acoustical Jam Tour	April 21, 2005	
Tesla	Forever More Tour	February 17, 2008	Cinder Road
Tesla	Twisted Wires Tour	November 5, 2011	Built by Stereo
Tesla	Simplicity Tour	July 3, 2014	American Dog
Testament	Practice What You Preach Tour	October 22, 1989	Annihilator
Testament	Practice What You Preach Tour	April 26, 1990	Savatage & Nuclear Assault
Thanksgiving Throwdown Concert		November 29, 2013	
Thanksgiving Throwdown Concert		November 28, 2014	
Theory of a Deadman	Gasoline Tour	January 21, 2005	Shinedown & No Address
Theory of a Deadman	Avalanche Tour	February 9, 2010	Halestorm, Adelitas Way & Taking Dawn
Theory of a Deadman	Self Titled Tour	May 8, 2012	Pop Evil & Stellar Revival
Third Eye Blind	2007 Tour	August 6, 2007	Thunderkatz
Thompson Square	2012 Tour	July 19, 2012	Charlie Worsham & Turnback Creek
Thousand Foot Krutch	The Art of Breaking Tour	April 30, 2006	Hawk Nelson, Falling Up & Run Kid Run
Thousand Foot Krutch	2007 Tour	March 21, 2007	
Three Days Grace	One-X Tour	December 10, 2006	Buckcherry & Crossfade
Toby Keith	How Do You Like Me Now?! Tour	February 25, 2000	
Tom Keifer	The Way Life Goes Tour	August 2, 2013	
Tool	Ænima Tour	March 7, 1997	Melvins
Tracy Lawrence	For the Love Tour	June 30, 2007	Matt Engels Band
Tracy Lawrence	The Singer Tour	June 16, 2012	Julienne Irwin
Tracy Lawrence	2013 Tour	February 14, 2013	Turnback Creek
Trans-Siberian Orchestra	2001 Christmas Tour	December 1, 2001	
Trivium & DevilDriver	2013 Tour	October 11, 2013	After the Burial & Empire Falls
Turnpike Troubadours	CD Release Party	May 4, 2012	Corb Lund Band & The Dirty River Boys
Turnpike Troubadours	2013 Tour	May 10, 2013	Jason Eady
Turnpike Troubadours	2014 Tour	March 7, 2014	Chris Knight
Two Tons of Steel	2010 Tour	October 2, 2010	
Tyga	Careless World: Rise of the Last King Tour	March 18, 2012	YG & Lil Twist
Underoath	Define the Great Line Tour	May 21, 2006	Poison the Well, As Cities Burn & Sincebyman
Union Station	2000 Tour	June 23, 2000	
Volbeat	Outlaw Gentlemen & Shady Ladies Tour	May 9, 2013	All That Remains & Eye Empire
W.A.S.P. & Metallica	Winged Assassins Tour	February 17, 1985	Armored Saint
W.A.S.P.	The Last Command Tour	March 11, 1986	
Wade Bowen	2010 Tour	January 2, 2010	Bart Crow Band
Wade Bowen	The Given Tour	January 4, 2013	Charlie Worsham
Wayne Hancock	2008 Tour	July 25, 2008	The DeWayn Brothers & Brody Buster
We Came as Romans	I'm Alive Tour	October 6, 2011	Miss May I, Of Mice & Men, Texas in July & Close to Home
"Weird Al" Yankovic	Bad Hair Day Tour	October 10, 1996	
"Weird Al" Yankovic	Running with Scissors Tour	March 15, 2000	
"Weird Al" Yankovic	Poodle Hat Tour	August 3, 2003	Elliot Threatt
"Weird Al" Yankovic	Straight Outta Lynwood Tour	August 7, 2008	
"Weird Al" Yankovic	2010 Tour	July 13, 2010	
White Lion	Pride Tour	July 27, 1989	Vixen
Wichita Blues Ball		January 19, 2008	
Wichita Blues Ball		January 10, 2009	
Wichita Blues Ball		January 14, 2012	
Wichita Blues Ball		January 19, 2013	
Wichita Blues Ball		January 10, 2015	
Wilco	2006 Tour	October 15, 2006	Altered Statesmen
Willie Nelson & Family	Songbird Tour	March 27, 2007	
Willie Nelson & Family	American Classic Tour	February 23, 2010	
Willie Nelson & Family	2011 Tour	March 10, 2011	
Willie Nelson & Family	Heroes Tour	August 14, 2012	Chase Rice
Xtreme	Chapter Dos: On the Verge Tour	April 23, 2010	Yenziel & Mike
The Yardbirds	Roger the Engineer Tour	August 15, 1966	The Frantics
Yelawolf	Trunk Muzik Returns Tour	April 30, 2014	Big Boyz & CMAJOR
Yellowcard	Paper Walls Tour	October 18, 2007	Blue October, Shiny Toy Guns & Love Drug
Ying Yang Twins	Chemically Imbalanced Tour	December 7, 2007	
Young the Giant	2012 Tour	June 5, 2012	Civil Twilight
ZOSO – The Ultimate Led Zeppelin Experience	2010 Tour	April 2, 2010	
ZOSO – The Ultimate Led Zeppelin Experience	2011 Tour	April 15, 2011	
ZOSO – The Ultimate Led Zeppelin Experience	2012 Tour	June 15, 2012	
ZOSO – The Ultimate Led Zeppelin Experience	2013 Tour	May 11, 2013	Paramount
ZOSO – The Ultimate Led Zeppelin Experience	2014 Tour	May 9, 2014	Honest Ape
Insane Clown Posse	October 2025 Tour	October 28, 2025	Juggalo Championship Wrestling
