= Somewhere in the Middle =

Studio album by Jason Boland & The Stragglers
- Released: September 21, 2004
- Genres: Red dirt, Texas country
- Label: Smith Music Group
- Producer: Lloyd Maines

Jason Boland & The Stragglers chronology
Live and Lit at Billy Bob's Texas (2002)	Somewhere in the Middle (2004)	The Bourbon Legend (2006)

Somewhere in the Middle is Jason Boland & The Stragglers's fourth album. It was released in September 2004. It is the first album by the band to be produced by Lloyd Maines. The song "Thunderbird Wine" is a cover of the Billy Joe Shaver song featured on the 1981 album I'm Just An Old Chunk Of Coal. The album itself is dedicated to Shaver, stating "may he live forever." The song "Hank" was originally recorded by Eleven Hundred Springs and released on their 2004 album, Bandwagon under the title, "Hank Williams Wouldn't Make It Now In Nashville, Tennessee". The last track features Randy Crouch singing lead vocals on the song, "Hope You Make It."

== Track listing ==
1. "Hank" (Aaron Wynne) - 3:21
2. "When I'm Stoned" (Jason Boland) - 3:22
3. "Somewhere In The Middle" (Boland) - 4:39
4. "If You Want To Hear A Love Song" (Boland) - 3:59
5. "Back To You" (Bob Childers) - 3:06
6. "Stand Up To The Man" (Boland) - 3:58
7. "Radio's Misbehaving" (Boland) - 3:44
8. "Dirty Fightin' Love" (Boland, Stoney LaRue) - 3:42
9. "12 Oz. Curls" (Randy Crouch) - 3:54
10. "Mary" (Boland) - 6:09
11. "Thunderbird Wine" (Billy Joe Shaver) - 5:20
12. "Hell Or Bust" (Boland) - 5:50
13. "Hope You Make It" (Crouch) - 8:03

== Personnel ==
- Jason Boland - Lead Vocals, Acoustic Guitar
- Roger Ray - Electric Guitar, Pedal Steel Guitar, Lap Steel, Resophonic Guitar
- Brad Rice - Drums, Harmony Vocals
- Grant Tracy - Bass
- Noah Jeffries - Fiddle, Mandolin
- Stoney LaRue - Acoustic Guitar, Harmony Vocals
- Randy Crouch - Lead Vocals (Track 13), Fiddle, Harmony Vocals
- Riley Osbourn - Hammond B3, Wurlitzer
- Lloyd Maines - Acoustic Guitar
- Dennis Ludiker - Fiddle
- Doug Moreland - Fiddle
- Will Dupuy - Acoustic Guitar
- Coby Weir - Electric Guitar
- John Michael Whitby - Piano
- Adam Odor - Accordion
- Billy Joe Shaver - Harmony Vocals
- Kathleen O'Keefe - Harmony Vocals
- Cody Braun - Harmony Vocals

== Chart performance ==
Chart (2004)	Peak position
US Top Country Albums (Billboard)	65
