= High in the Rockies: A Live Album =

Live album by Jason Boland & The Stragglers
- Released: April 20, 2010
- Genre: Red dirt, Texas country
- Label: Thirty Tigers
- Producer: Jason Boland & the Stragglers, Mike Morgan, Pat Manske

Jason Boland & The Stragglers chronology
Comal County Blue (2008)	High in the Rockies: A Live Album (2010)	Rancho Alto (2011)

High in the Rockies: A Live Album is Jason Boland & The Stragglers' second live album. It was released in April 2010. The recordings come from four live concerts over four days from January 7, 2010 to January 10, 2010. The shows were performed in Steamboat Springs, Colorado, Ft. Collins, Colorado, Laramie, Wyoming, and Denver, Colorado, respectively.

== Track listing ==
1. "Hank" (Aaron Wynne) - 3:17
2. "No Reason Being Late" (Jason Boland) - 3:09
3. "Alright" (Boland, Cody Canada) - 3:15
4. "Comal County Blue" (Boland) - 4:24
5. "Bourbon Legend" (Boland, Pete Anderson, Drew Kennedy) - 3:07
6. "Tulsa Time" (Danny Flowers) - 3:43
7. "Backslider Blues" (Boland) - 5:25
8. "Down Here On Earth" (Boland) - 2:58
9. "No One Left To Blame" (Boland, Anderson) - 3:51
10. "Bottle By My Bed" (Boland) - 4:36
11. "Gallo Del Cielo" (Tom Russell) - 6:41
12. "Blowing Through The Hills" (Boland) - 4:04
13. "Time In Hell" (Boland, Anderson) - 4:23
14. "Jesus and Ruger" (Boland) - 3:49
15. "Up and Gone" (Boland, Anderson) - 3:37
16. "Rainbow Stew" (Merle Haggard) - 2:45
17. "The Party's Not Over" (Boland, Roger Ray) - 3:47
18. "If I Ever Get Back (To Oklahoma)" (Boland) - 4:10
19. "Outlaw Band" (Bob Childers, Randy Crouch, Layle Stagner) - 5:10

== Personnel ==
- Jason Boland - acoustic guitar, electric guitar, lead vocals
- Noah Jeffries - fiddle, mandolin, background vocals
- Roger Ray - dobro, electric guitar, steel guitar
- Brad Rice - drums, background vocals
- Grant Tracy - bass guitar

== Chart performance ==
Chart (2010)	Peak position
U.S. Billboard Top Country Albums	27
U.S. Billboard 200	136
U.S. Billboard Top Heatseekers	3
U.S. Billboard Top Independent Albums	21
