= Jason Boland =

Jason Boland may refer to:

- Jason Boland, member and lead vocalist and guitarist for the Texas-based US band Jason Boland & The Stragglers
- Jason Boland, member and bass guitarist of the Irish rock band Kodaline
