= Dark & Dirty Mile =

Studio album by Jason Boland & The Stragglers
- Released: May 14, 2013
- Genre: Red dirt, Texas country
- Length: 45:16
- Label: Proud Souls Entertainment/Thirty Tigers

Jason Boland & The Stragglers chronology
Rancho Alto (2011)	Dark & Dirty Mile (2013)

Dark & Dirty Mile is the seventh studio album (ninth overall) by Red Dirt/Texas Country band Jason Boland & The Stragglers. It was released on May 14, 2013. Shooter Jennings co-produced the album with the band.

The title track was a top five single on the Texas Music chart in May 2013.

== Track listing ==
1. "Dark and Dirty Mile" (Jason Boland, Stoney LaRue) - 4:09
2. "Electric Bill" (Boland, Boland) - 3:15
3. "Lucky I Guess" (Boland) - 5:07
4. "The Only One" (Boland) - 3:58
5. "They Took It Away" (Randy Crouch) - 3:31
6. "Ludlow" (Boland) - 4:07
7. "Nine Times Out of Ten" (Boland) - 3:43
8. "Blue Diamond" (Bob Childers, Brad Piccolo) - 3:42
9. "Green Screen" (Boland) - 3:19
10. "Spend All Your Time" (Boland) - 4:59
11. "See You When I See You" (Boland) - 5:23

== Personnel ==
=== The Stragglers ===
- Jason Boland - vocals, guitars
- Roger Ray - lead guitar, pedal steel, dobro
- Grant Tracy - bass
- Brad Rice - drums, harmony vocals
- Nick Worley - fiddle, mandolin, harmony vocals

=== Additional musicians ===
- Noah Jeffries - banjo
- John Michael Whitby - piano, hammond organ
- Dave Perez - accordion
- John Silva - percussion
- Mike Hudson - percussion
- Shooter Jennings - guitar

== Chart performance ==
Chart (2013)	Peak position
US Top Country Albums (Billboard)	25
US Billboard 200	89
US Independent Albums (Billboard)	18
