= Charles Koch Arena =

Multi-purpose arena at Wichita State University, Kansas

- The Roundhouse
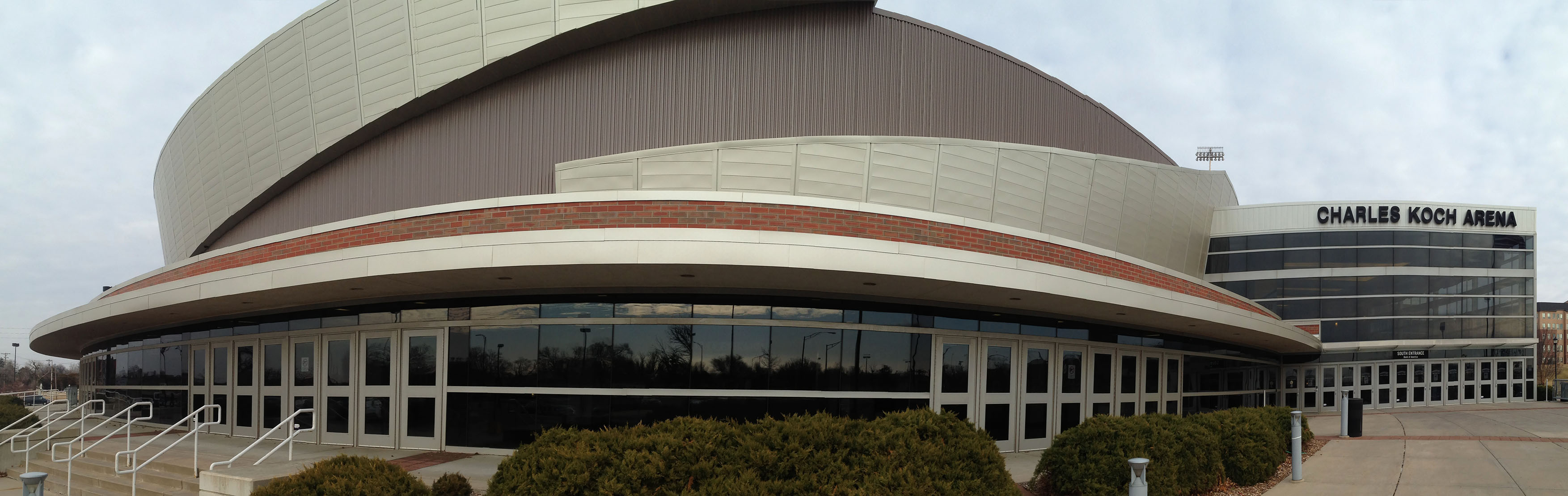
- Interactive map of Charles Koch Arena
- Former names: University of Wichita Field House (1955–1964); WSU Field House (1964–1969); Levitt Arena (1969–2003)
- Location: Wichita State University; SE corner of 21st and Hillside; Wichita, Kansas 67260
- Coordinates: 37°43′18″N 97°17′51″W
- Owner: Wichita State University
- Operator: Wichita State University
- Capacity: 10,506
- Surface: Hardwood

Construction
- Groundbreaking: 1953
- Opened: December 3, 1955
- Renovated: 2002–2003
- Cost: $1.4 million (original construction) ($16.8 million in 2025 dollars) $25 million (renovation)

Tenants
- Wichita State Shockers men's basketball (1955–2002, 2003–present); Wichita State Shockers women's basketball (1995–2002, 2003–present); Wichita State Shockers volleyball (1974–1980, 1991–2001, 2003–present)

Charles Koch Arena is a 10,506-seat multi-purpose arena in Wichita, Kansas, United States. It is located on the southeast corner of 21st and Hillside on the campus of Wichita State University in northeast Wichita. The arena is home to the Wichita State Shockers men's basketball, women's basketball, and women's volleyball teams.

== History ==
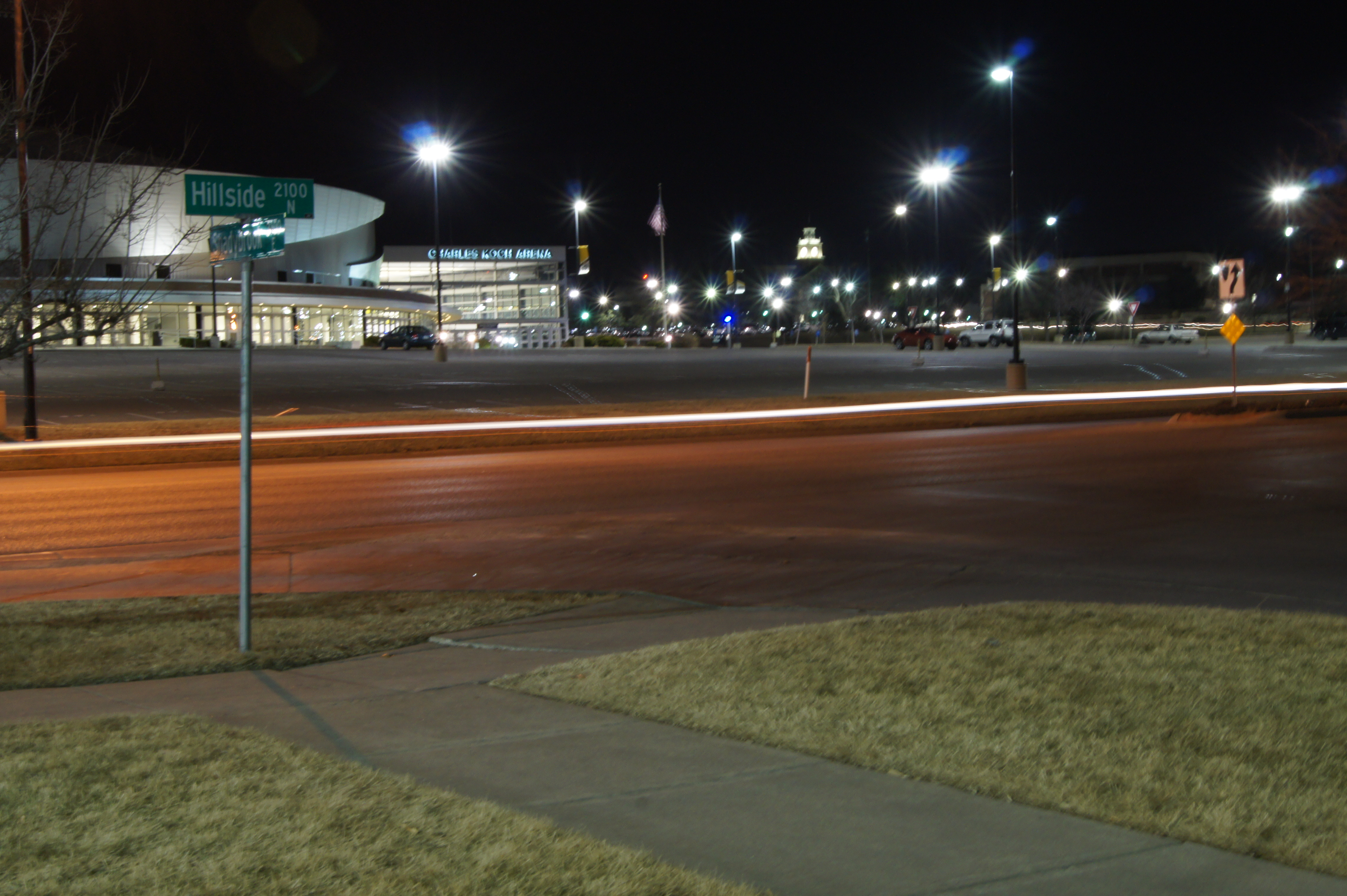
Charles Koch Arena

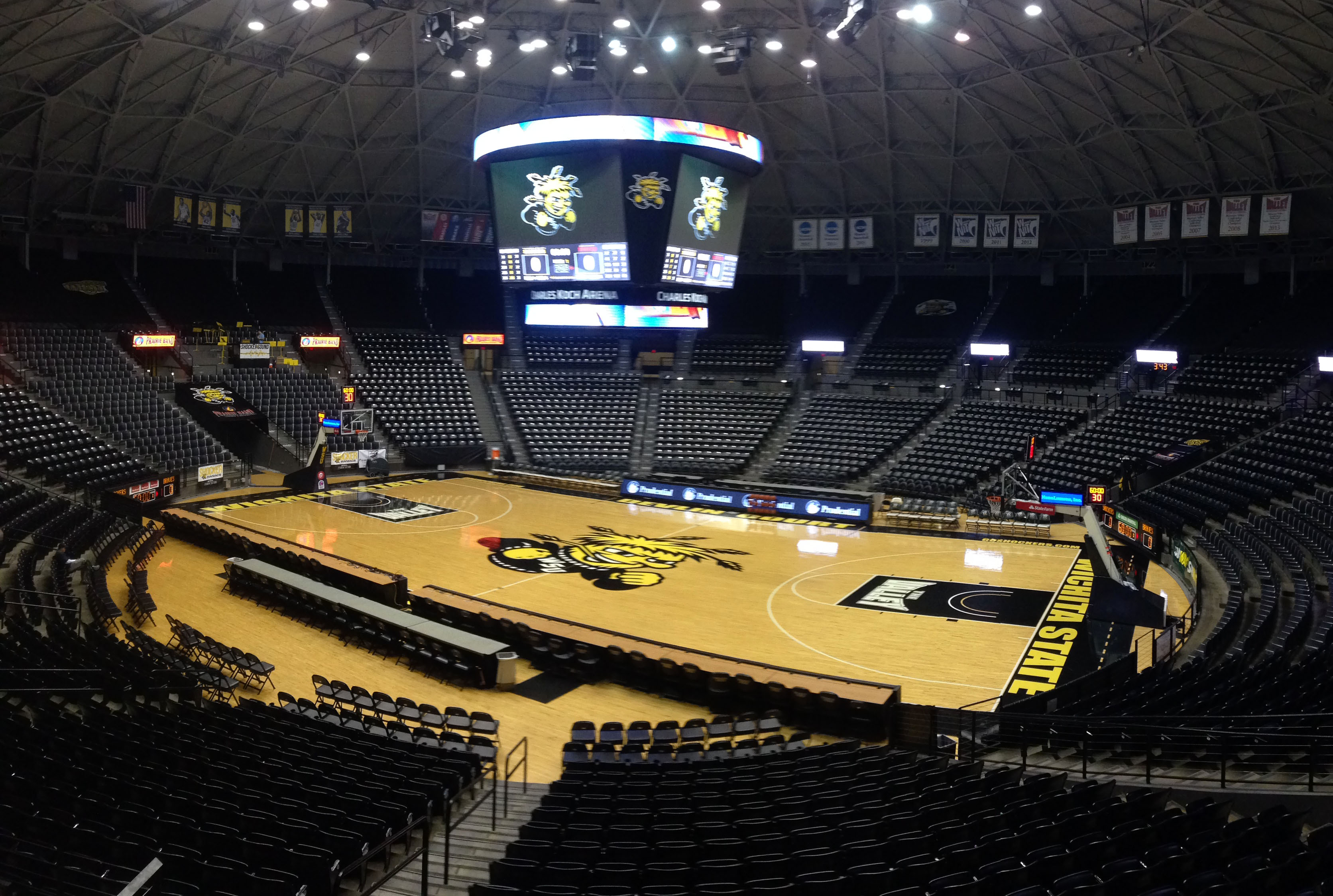
Interior of Charles Koch Arena

The arena was originally built in 1953 as the University of Wichita Field House by what was then the Municipal University of Wichita. It was considered several years ahead of its time because of its circular design, which gave nearly every fan a clear sight line and put the seats very close to the action. As a result, it was quickly nicknamed "The Roundhouse," a name that has stuck to this day. When Wichita joined the state university system in 1964, the arena was renamed the WSU Field House.

In 1969, the arena was officially renamed Levitt Arena after Wichita department store magnate Henry Levitt, who had recently died. Levitt's Wichita clothing store sponsored basketball team won three consecutive national Amateur Athletic Union titles in the 1930s at a time when colleges and corporate-sponsored teams competed in the same tournament.

Following a $6 million endowment from Charles Koch the arena underwent a $25 million renovation in 2002–03, popularly known as the "Roundhouse Renaissance". The old arena concourse was completely demolished and a new one built around the original playing/seating area. A portion of the seating bowl was remodeled to make for more legroom. The basketball court itself became Devlin Court, named after a family of program supporters. All new seating was installed as well as a video scoreboard, and virtually every surface that was not renovated was given a fresh coat of paint. The Shocker basketball teams played at the Kansas Coliseum for the 2002–03 season while the arena was rebuilt, while the volleyball team played at the Heskett Center on the WSU campus.

In December 2012, ESPN ranked Charles Koch Arena at number 10 in the nation in a poll on home-court advantages in College Basketball. In January 2013, ESPN's Jason King listed Koch Arena as the 7th best home court advantage in college basketball.

== Events ==
Elvis Presley gave three performances at the arena with the first concert there happening on June 19, 1972. The other two times were October 7, 1974, and December 27, 1976, with the latter occurring almost seven months before his death on August 16, 1977.

It hosted the 1977 and 1989 Missouri Valley Conference men's basketball tournament title game. It also hosted games for the opening rounds of the 1981 NCAA Division I men's basketball tournament.

In addition to concerts, the arena has also hosted the Ringling Brothers and Barnum and Bailey Circus, Disney on Ice and Champions on Ice, both as Levitt Arena and Koch Arena. American Idols Live! has performed annually at Koch Arena since 2003.

Koch Arena hosted the 2008 Kansas State High School Activities Association Class 6A state wrestling tournament. The arena also hosts numerous high school basketball games involving schools from the Wichita City League. The KSHSAA Class 6A boys and girls basketball state tournaments moved to Koch Arena from Emporia State University's William L. White Auditorium in 2011.

== See also ==
- List of NCAA Division I basketball arenas

Sports facilities on WSU campus

- Cessna Stadium (track)
- Eck Stadium (baseball)

Facilities in Wichita area

- Century II Convention Hall (downtown Wichita)
- Cotillion Ballroom (west Wichita)
- Intrust Bank Arena (downtown Wichita)
- Hartman Arena (north of Wichita, in Park City)
