= Rancho Alto =

Studio album by Jason Boland & The Stragglers
- Released: October 4, 2011
- Genre: Red dirt, Texas country
- Length: 47:58
- Label: Apex Music
- Producer: Lloyd Maines

Jason Boland & The Stragglers chronology
| High in the Rockies: A Live Album (2010) | Rancho Alto (2011) | Dark & Dirty Mile (2013) |

Rancho Alto is Jason Boland & The Stragglers's seventh studio album. It was produced by Lloyd Maines and released in October 2011 on the Apex music label in collaboration with Thirty Tigers and Proud Souls Entertainment.

== Track listing ==
1. "Down Here In The Hole" (Boland) - 3:10
2. "Every Moment I'm Gone" (Boland) - 5:05
3. "False Accuser's Lament" (Boland) - 4:27
4. "Between 11 And 2" (Boland, Jeffries) - 4:36
5. "Pushing Luck" - (Boland, Jeffries) 3:40
6. "Fences" (Boland) - 3:34
7. "Mary Ellen's Greenhouse" (Boland) - 3:47
8. "Obsessed" (Boland) - 4:13
9. "Woody's Road" (Childers)- 4:08
10. "Forever Together Again" (Ray) - 4:31
11. "Farmer's Luck" (Jacobs) - 6:47

== Personnel ==
- Jason Boland - Vocals, Guitar
- Roger Ray - Pedal Steel, Dobro
- Grant Tracy - Bass
- Brad Rice - Drums
- Noah Jeffries - Fiddle, Mandolin
- Jeremy Watkins - Fiddle
- Lloyd Maines - Banjo, Dulcimer, Guitar
- Mikey Hudson - Percussion
- Aaron Lain - Percussion
- Riley Osbourne - Organ, Piano
- Coby Wier - Guitar

== Chart performance ==
| Chart (2011) | Peak position |
|---|---|
| U.S. Billboard 200 | 130 |
| U.S. Billboard Top Country Albums | 26 |
| U.S. Billboard Top Heatseekers | 3 |
| U.S. Billboard Independent Albums | 21 |
