= The Bourbon Legend =

Studio album by Jason Boland & The Stragglers
- Released: October 31, 2006
- Genre: Red dirt, Texas country
- Label: Sustain Records
- Producer: Pete Anderson

Jason Boland & The Stragglers chronology
Somewhere in the Middle (2004)	The Bourbon Legend (2006)	Comal County Blue (2008)

The Bourbon Legend is Jason Boland & The Stragglers's fifth album. It was released in the fall of 2006. The song "Rattlesnakes" is a cover, co-written with Bob Childers. It was produced by longtime Dwight Yoakam collaborator Pete Anderson.

== Track listing ==
No.	Title	Length
1.	"Last Country Song"	3:40
2.	"The Bourbon Legend"	3:19
3.	"No One Left To Blame"	4:02
4.	"Jesus And Ruger"	3:27
5.	"Up And Gone"	4:40
6.	"Baby That's Just Me"	4:11
7.	"Can't Tell If I Drink"	3:29
8.	"Lonely By Choice"	2:59
9.	"Rattlesnakes"	3:38
10.	"Time In Hell"	4:06
11.	"Everyday Life"	5:22
Total length:		47:13

== Personnel ==
- Jason Boland - Vocals, Acoustic Guitar
- Roger Ray - Electric Guitar, Pedal Steel, Lap Steel
- Brad Rice - Drums
- Grant Tracy - Bass Guitar
- Noah Jeffries - Fiddle, Mandolin
- Pete Anderson - Electric Guitar, Acoustic Guitar, Bass Guitar, Mandolin, Dobro, Banjo, Percussion
- Bob "Boo" Bernstein - Pedal Steel
- Donny Reed - Fiddle
- Anthony Crawford - Background Vocals
- Tommy Funderburk - Background Vocals
- Michael Murphy - Keyboards

== Charts ==
Chart (2006)	Peak position
U.S. Billboard Top Country Albums	67
