= Jake Gill =

American country singer-songwriter

- Born: Jacob Dwain Gill; August 23, 1976 (age 50); Meade, Kansas, U.S.
- Origin: Hutchinson, Kansas, U.S.
- Genres: Country
- Occupation: Singer-songwriter
- Instruments: Vocals; guitar
- Years active: 2012–present
- Label: VRL 2.5
- Website: http://jakegill.net

Jacob Dwain Gill (born August 23, 1976), more commonly known as Jake Gill, is an American country music singer-songwriter and guitarist from Kansas. He gained attention following an appearance on The Voice, and has since released several albums and singles, toured across many U.S. states, and built up a following for his energetic live shows and storytelling songwriting style. Gill has charted six singles on the Music Row Breakout Country singles charts, including "Kansas Queen" and "If Jesus Was A Cowboy". Additionally, he has shared the stage with numerous country stars, including Jason Aldean, Chris Cagle, Jake Owen, and Easton Corbin.

== Early life ==
Jacob Dwain Gill was born on August 23, 1976, in Meade, Kansas and grew up in Sylvia, Kansas on a family farm. He cites his grandfather and listening to country music on KFDI-AM as early inspirations. Additionally, Gill's father was a music teacher, which contributed to his early exposure to music.

After graduating high school, Gill pursued a career in chiropractic care and earned his chiropractic degree from Cleveland University-Kansas City in 2000. Gill spent the next fifteen years as a full-time chiropractor in Hutchinson, Kansas.

== Music career ==
In 2012, Jake Gill appeared on The Voice, which he identifies as a turning point toward making music his full‑time pursuit. In that same year, he released his debut album, Guts, Guns, & Jesus, featuring the singles "John Deere Rockstar" and "Say It...Goodbye." After releasing the album, Gill started touring and playing concerts across the country. He won a songwriting contest for the Kansas Country Stampede music festival in Manhattan, Kansas, and opened for Jake Owen and Jason Aldean on the main stage in front of over 50,000 fans on June 28, 2013. "Performing at the Country Stampede was surreal," Gill said. "I wasn’t nervous for a moment. My band and I were treated like royalty the whole weekend. It was a really nice reward for a year’s worth of hard work."

In 2014, Gill released his second album, Tailgate Tradition, featuring singles such as the title track and the fan favorite "Kansas Queen", which also had a music video. Gill kept touring and opened for more country stars at festivals and music venues, including Chris Cagle, Phil Vassar, Easton Corbin, and Miranda Lambert. The next year, he released his third album, Insanity, with singles such as "Cricket Serenade" and "Red Dirt Roots", which Red Dirt Roots Outdoor TV used as their theme song. In 2019, he released his fourth album, Jake Gill, which included the singles "Baby I'm On It" and "You're My Girl."

Gill has continued releasing new singles and expanded his social media platform, gaining millions of views on TikTok with his 2022 hit "Crazy Girl", which has achieved 33 million streams, his 2022 hit "If Jesus Was a Cowboy," which was his sixth charting single on the Music Row Breakout Country charts, his 2023 hit "Small Town Boy", and his newest hit from 2025, "Sun's Out, Guns Out." His touring career has also expanded, as Gill has even played 180 shows in 37 states over the course of a year. As of 2025, Gill and his band continue to release music and tour. His live shows continue to draw large crowds, with active fan participation and a growing social media presence.

== Musical style ==
Gill's musical style is a blend of classic and modern country, combining storytelling lyrics with energetic performances. He has said that country music resonated with him for its authenticity, narrative approach, and emotional honesty.

== Charity work ==
Gill is involved in benefit and community‑oriented concerts; for instance, shows supporting veterans such as the "No Veteran Alone" concert series, shows supporting children through ChildFund, and meet and greets including acoustic sets.

== Personal life ==
Gill currently resides in Nashville, Tennessee for his music career. However, his roots remain strongly tied to Kansas.

== Discography ==
Studio albums

- Guts, Guns, & Jesus (2012)
- Tailgate Tradition (2014)
- Insanity (2015)
- Jake Gill (2019)

Singles

- Good Time (2021)
- These Woods Come Alive (2021)
- If Jesus Was a Cowboy (2022)
- Crazy Girl (2022)
- Let's Get Dirty (2022)
- Together (2023)
- Don't Wanna Cry (2023)
- Positivity (2023)
- Small Town Boy (2024)
- This Roof (2024)
- Broken Angel (2024)
- Sun's Out Guns Out (2025)
