= This Charming Life =

Studio album by Joan Armatrading
- Released: 30 March 2010
- Recorded: Bumpkin Studios
- Genre: Rock, Pop
- Length: 45:06
- Label: 429, Hypertension
- Producer: Joan Armatrading

Joan Armatrading chronology
Into the Blues (2007)	This Charming Life (2010)	Live at the Royal Albert Hall (2011)

This Charming Life is the seventeenth studio album by British singer-songwriter Joan Armatrading, and was released on 30 March 2010. The album was recorded during 2009 by Armatrading at Bumpkin Studios, her own purpose-built studios, and mastered at Metropolis Studios. It was released on the 429 label (Catalogue number: 17760) and the Hypertension label (HYP 10272). Armatrading's third live album Live at the Royal Albert Hall was recorded as part of the tour that accompanied the release of This Charming Life.

== Background ==
This Charming Life is the second of a trilogy of albums by Armatrading each concerned with a specific genre of music. She wrote and produced three albums focused on blues, rock and jazz music respectively, and This Charming Life is the second of these, and is an album that focuses on "guitar-driven rock"

Armatrading wrote and arranged all the songs on the album and plays all the instruments except for drums and percussion. She also produced the album. The tracks "This Charming Life" and "Best Dress On" were released as singles.

== Reception ==
Mark Deming of Allmusic said that This Charming Life "represents the toughest and most aggressive music she's recorded since Walk Under Ladders and The Key. He praised "the force of the music and the passion of the songs", concluding that Armatrading remains "a masterful songwriter [who] speaks with wisdom, clarity, and fire".

Thom Jurek of Allmusic referred to This Charming Life as "a critical triumph".

Charles Donelan of the Santa Barbara Independent commented: "It's exciting to hear rock music this raw and vibrant filtered through the sensibility of such an articulate and experienced songwriter".

William Douglas McClatchy of the Pittsburgh Post-Gazette commented that "This Charming Life showcases [Armatrading's] eclectic blend of rock, pop, rhythm & blues and a hint of reggae."

Christian John Wikane of Pop Matters described the album as "a musical statement that brings all of her talents – writing, playing, producing, and maximizing the idiosyncrasies of her malleable voice—into sharp focus".

== Track listing ==
All songs written and arranged by Joan Armatrading.

1. "This Charming Life" – 3:53
2. "Love Love Love" – 3:57
3. "People Who Win" – 3:52
4. "Two Tears" – 4:31
5. "Heading Back to New York City" – 3:57
6. "Goddess of Change" – 3:30
7. "Diamond" – 4:24
8. "Promises" – 4:05
9. "Virtual Reality" – 4:31
10. "Best Dress On" – 4:11
11. "Cry" – 4:03

== Personnel ==
Musicians

- Joan Armatrading – all vocals and all instruments (guitars, bass, keyboards)
- Miles Bould – drums, percussion (all tracks)

Production

- Producer: Joan Armatrading
- Arranger: Joan Armatrading
- Engineer: Graham Dickson
- Mixed by: Graham Dickson & Joan Armatrading
- Mastered by: Tim Young
- Photography: Joel Anderson
- Design: David Alan Kogut
