= Acidic (band) =

American indie rock band

ACIDIC is an indie rock band from Southern California. The band consists of lead vocalist /guitarist Michael Gossard, drummer Matt Whitaker, guitarist/vocalist Josh Bennett, and bassist/vocalist Max Myrick.

== History ==
Michael Gossard started performing together in his high school's rock band (Crespi Carmelite) with his childhood friend, Ted Dubrawski. Michael then formed the band now known as ACIDIC in his freshman year. In 2008, Matt Whitaker was added to the band after the two met him at Loyola High School. Whitaker is a paediatric cancer survivor, having overcome leukemia when he was seven.

ACIDIC's debut tour in Southern California began in October 2008, at what was then the Knitting Factory in Hollywood, followed by the first of many appearances at the Whisky a Go Go. ACIDIC was a three-piece band with Gossard, Dubrawski, and Whitaker, but they soon added a fourth member, guitarist Andy Sabatine. Their early promotional efforts soon focused beyond their local shows but also on their first full self-released CD Ironic Dreams. In 2009, the band introduced a new member, guitarist/vocalist Michael Thompson.

ACIDIC bridged 2010 and 2011 in Europe, on a New Year's tour with the Armed Forces Entertainment Network, performing at the US Army/NATO base Camp Bondsteel in Kosovo and Ramstein AFB and Spangdahlem AFB in Germany. The band also began a collaboration with producer John Ryan of Chicago Kid Productions (Styx, Santana, the Allman Brothers, Lynyrd Skynyrd, and more).

ACIDIC's touring expanded into the Midwest in 2011, adding another showcase at SXSW, a second performance at the Sunset Strip Music Festival, and with routings supporting Marcy Playground, Fuel, and Alien Ant Farm. ACIDIC's "Strata Red" from the Getting Lucky CD also won the Alternative category in the 18th Billboard WorldWide Song Contest. The year concluded with ACIDIC being named one of Music Review's "12 BANDS TO WATCH IN 2012"

2012 opened with ACIDIC as a featured band at the 2012 Winter NAMM Show at the Anaheim Convention Center. The year featured even more ambitious touring, solidifying the band's growing reputation in the Midwest and opening up the East Coast with such headliners as Filter and Candlebox. Standout events in 2012 included a featured performance at the Florida Music Festival, and their first-ever headlining show at Doug Weston's Troubadour in mid-summer, By year's end, guitarist/vocalist Josh Bennett, formerly of the Palmdale CA rockers Order 66, settled in as ACIDIC's fourth band member, replacing Thompson. They then started work on their next album.

ACIDIC started 2014 with bassist/vocalist Max Myrick coming aboard, replacing Dubrawski. The band launched their first-ever headlining tour, the "Electric Cool-aid ACIDIC Tour," performing throughout the Rockies and Pacific Northwest during January and February. ACIDIC's show at Herman's Hideaway in Denver was that venue's "best Wednesday night in a year," and their performance at Machinery Row in Great Falls MT was that club's "best Monday night EVER!" The band's touring schedule was growing in scope, with another booking at "2Broke 2Rock" at the Knitting Factory in Spokane. New music was already being tested with fans on the road and winning raves never before seen in preparation for their next CD. The upcoming album is the third ACIDIC album produced by John Ryan of Chicago Kid Productions, who by this point has become a valued adviser and mentor to the band.

== Ironic Dreams ==
ACIDIC's very first full-length CD, Ironic Dreams, was produced by Michael Gossard, while still a high school student. He played most of the instruments because the full line-up of the band was not in place yet.

Track Listing

1. Her Walls Are Coming Down

2. Lost the Will

3. Strata Red

4. Move On

5. The Addict

6. Ironic Dreams

7. Break Me Down

8. Black Box

9. Without A Trace

10. Good Bye

11. When I Fade Away

12. You're So Dangerous

== Getting Lucky ==
Their second album Getting Lucky, a 12 track CD, was produced by duo The Wizardz of Oz, Andrew Bojanic and Liz Hooper (who have previously worked with artists such as Liz Phair and Avril Lavigne). Released March 22, 2010, it features the ballad "Maybe", which debuted on the FMQB Hot AC radio spin chart in early May at No. 78 and eventually reached the top 40. "Tell Me" and "The Big Bang" were featured rock tracks for Triple A Radio. Two songs, "Move On" and "Strata Red" are re-recordings of tracks that originally appeared on Ironic Dreams. "Strata Red" later won First-Place honors in the Alternative Category at the 18th Billboard WorldWide Song Contest.

Track Listing

1. Tell Me

2. The Big Bang

3. Move On

4. No Name

5. It's OK

6. Strata Red

7. Let Me Take You Away

8. Closer to the Sun

9. Liar

10. Waiting for Someone

11. Retrograde

12. Maybe

== Chronic Satisfaction ==
On September 20, 2011, ACIDIC released their third full-length album. The album was produced by multi-platinum award-winner John Ryan (who has produced albums for Styx, Santana, Lynyrd Skynyrd, Allman Brothers) of Chicago Kid Productions. Several earlier tunes were reworked and definitely "new and improved," including "Break Me Down," "Her Walls Are Coming Down," "Black Box," "Goodbye," and "Ironic Dreams." The opening track, "Uninspired," garnered airplay on radio stations from coast-to-coast and Canada. "The Brave" was a song written by Michael Gossard after ACIDIC's visit to Ramstein Air Force Base in Germany, during which time the band witnessed wounded soldiers returning from the Iraq War, being transported to hospital facilities on the base. The album boasts riveting original cover art by young Arizona artist Lucas Borncamp. “Chronic Satisfaction” was recorded with all members playing live in true rock concert style, each track recorded in a single take.

Track Listing

1. Uninspired

2. Break Me Down

3. Call for More

4. Her Walls Are Coming Down

5. Black box

6. Goodbye

7. Fifteen Miles Away

8. The Brave

9. Ironic Dreams

== Copper Man ==
“Copper Man", the band's fourth album was released March 11, 2013, again with the help of John Ryan. ACIDIC then earned a distribution deal with Sony/RED via MegaForce Records. Mötley Crüe's Nikki Sixx named both the title track and "Drive Thru" “Sixx Picks of the Week” on his syndicated radio "Side Show". The music video “Copper Man” has hit over 1,000,000 views on YouTube. The album features guest vocals from Candlebox front man Kevin Martin, and Los Angeles singer/songwriter/impresario Kota Wade, who co-wrote the ballad "Believe" with Michael Gossard; and additional lead guitar licks from guest artist Nick Papa George of the L.A.-based band thatwasthen. The album cover features another example of original artwork by Chicago-based artist/designer Bendow.

Track Listing

1. Copper Man

2. Satellite

3. Monster

4. Only One

5. Drive Thru

6. Forever More

7. Looking Glass

8. Pirate Eyes

9. Hail to the Yeti

10. Believe

== Charity ==
In 2008 and 2009, ACIDIC donated a portion of their online album sales to the East Valley Animal Shelter in Los Angeles. The band also has their own charity, Help Us Help, which contributes to various charities in the Los Angeles area. In 2009, they helped to raise funds for the One Love for Chi foundation, a charity that helps cover the medical expenses of Deftones bass player Chi Cheng. ACIDIC is also involved with The Leukemia & Lymphoma Society, which helped drummer Matt Whitaker and his family during his battle with cancer. The band has supported that organization since 2008, playing at Light the Night walk-a-thon events and Man/Woman of the Year fundraisers. They worked with Charitybuzz in the spring of 2010, auctioning a guest slot in the band at one of their Whisky a Go Go concerts, which was won by a 17-year-old guitarist from Seattle.

== Reception ==
The band have enjoyed positive feedback for both their live performances and their recordings. Abigail Miller of BLUERAILROAD.com: “Frontman Michael Gossard is a force of nature, connecting to his audience and his band mates in ways that make an ACIDIC show highly electrifying.” RUKUS magazine: “These guys aren’t afraid to rock out. Gossard can really wail with his vocal at times and the band is full of energy. They move all over the stage, enjoying every minute of every song they play.” PERFORMER magazine: “Straight from the get go, ACIDIC brings forth its frenetic energy and passionate sound in waves of indie alternative delight. This band brings the goods, with personality and flair unmatched in many West Coast bands.“ The Inlander's Laura Johnson says, “ACIDIC plays the sort of dense, noisy rock that’s not quite metal, not quite punk. But with its pulsing rhythms, not-too-serious lyrics and towering guitar solos, it’s the kind of rock that begs to be heard.“ Of their live performances, Upstate Metal stated, “Entrancing, incredible sound and vibe the band gave off… Gossard ran through the crowd while singing soulfully and jumped onto the bar, taking everyone by surprise…killer performance!”

Future Rock Stars of America said of the band, "The instrumentals are very upbeat and have an old school rock tone to them...this young group sound like a band on the rise." All Access Magazine said Acidic has, "Produced a peppy, punky package of original tunes" and said of their live show, "Acidic's members concluded yet another stop on their ascent to the broader acclaim and popularity this energetic young Westside trio merits." Campus Circle Magazine said, "Acidic is a good band with a lot of energy. They are professionals with a clean style who are able to achieve an energetic stage presence while still appearing like three very approachable guys...their solid rock songs and jovial, happy stage demeanor left me feeling cheerful and optimistic."
