= Grasshopper Takeover =

Grasshopper Takeover (also known as GTO) were a band from Omaha, Nebraska, United States. They were formed in December 1995. Its members were Bob Boyce (vocals, drums), Curtis Grubb (vocals, guitar), James McMann (bass), and they were later joined by Michael Cioffero (guitar). They released five full-length albums and three EPs. Their last EPs, Hear No Evil and See No Evil, were part of a three-disc collection that was never completed.

Prior to Grasshopper Takeover, Grubb and Boyce were both in a band called Kind. Since Grasshopper Takeover, Boyce and McMann have worked with their band, Two Drag Club, performing primarily in the Omaha area. Grubb owns a recording studio, and Cioffero went on to pursue a doctorate in classical guitar.

In August 2003, GTO played at the Paris Las Vegas for VH1's Summers End Concert. Having qualified for the event via a national online competition, GTO played in a showcase with several other bands. The show was headlined by the Donnas and the Goo Goo Dolls.

== Members ==
- Curtis Grubb - vocals, guitar (1995-)
- Bob Boyce - drums, vocals (1995-)
- James McMann - bass (1995-)
- Ben Zinn - guitar (2005-2005)

=== Former members ===
- Tyler Owen - guitar
- Michael Cioffero - guitar (2003–2005)

== Discography ==
CDs

- Grasshopper Takeover (1997)
- Gaia (1998)
- International Dance Marathon (2000)
- The Green Album (2001)
- Elephant Dreams (2003)

EPs

- Echo Park (1999)
- Hear No Evil (2003)
- See No Evil (2005)
