= Candy Coburn =

American singer-songwriter

Candy Coburn is an American national performing country music artist who has shared the stage with many notable artists, including Brooks and Dunn, Kellie Pickler, Montgomery Gentry, Blake Shelton, Miranda Lambert, Gary Allan, Josh Turner, Lady Antebellum and others. Scheduled to release her third album in 2010, Candy's most notable contribution to music so far has been her song, "Pink Warrior."

== Pink Warrior ==
"Pink Warrior" was co-written by Candy Coburn, whose grandmother fought breast cancer for 10 years, along with respected Nashville writers Kaci Bolls, Candy Cameron and Roxie Dean. It was produced by Nashville producer, Joe Scaife, who is also known for his work with Montgomery Gentry and Gretchen Wilson. With her grandmother's long battle with cancer in mind, Coburn hoped the song would someday be an inspiration to others who have been touched by cancer. She was surprised when she was contacted by the well-known Susan G. Komen for the Cure organization only one month after Pink Warrior was recorded. In an agreement with Susan G. Komen for the Cure, 100% of the artist and producer proceeds from sales of the song are donated to Komen, and Candy Coburn became a celebrity ambassador for Susan G. Komen for the Cure, using her extensive tour schedule averaging over 150 dates per year as a platform to help increase awareness about the fight against breast cancer. The song got its official debut when Candy performed Pink Warrior during the parade of more than 3,600 breast cancer survivors representing 18 countries at the first annual Susan G. Komen Global Race for the Cure in Washington, D.C., on The National Mall on June 6, 2009.

Following the Global Race, Candy went on to perform in many venues throughout the country, including numerous major state fairs, college events, NASCAR, and other Komen related events. After a September 4, 2009, performance of "Pink Warrior" at the New York State Fair, Mark Bialczak of The Post-Standard wrote: "It was soaring song about women who fight the disease every day. And it wasn't just the folks in the "Pink Warrior" section who cheered Coburn for it."

In 2010 "Pink Warrior" is being used as the theme song for the Susan G. Komen 3-Day for the Cure events. In addition to her own full tour schedule for 2010, Candy is scheduled to perform for all of the 3-Day events in 15 major U.S. cities.

The video for Pink Warrior can be seen on YouTube.

== History ==
Candy Coburn was born in Kentucky and raised in Missouri and Texas. Her love for music came from her grandmother, who listened to gospel music along with Glenn Miller, Loretta Lynn and George Jones. Candy knew from her very earliest memories she was meant for a career in music entertainment and began to dedicate herself to learning everything she needed to become a successful performer.

She went to the University of Missouri on a vocal scholarship and completed a degree in Theatre. Although her performances in the university musicals were very popular with audiences, Candy was drawn more toward a career as a musician.

After college, Candy began learning to write her own songs and later got the first of a series of green guitars which quickly became known as her signature green guitar. When the guitar was irreparably damaged in a car accident on the way to the Season 3 Regional competition of Nashville Star, the Alvarez Guitar company found out about the accident and provided her with several green guitars during a two-year endorsement deal. In 2008, the Carvin Corporation picked up where Alvarez left off and continued to provide Candy with her signature green guitars.

Candy's first album, Enjoy the Ride, was followed by her second, Rev It Up, which came out in 2007. Coburn focused on including songs with a Southern Rock style on her album and in shows. While writing and searching for music to put on the Rev It Up album, Candy's friend and mentor, George McCorkle of the original Marshall Tucker Band offered to let her choose one of his songs to include on her second album and agreed to accompany her. Candy chose "Fire On the Mountain." McCorkle appeared several times on stage with Coburn after the album release to sing the song with her. McCorkle's final show of support came when he made the trip from his home in Tennessee to appear on a live Missouri CW 11 television special, "Live at the Gillioz with Candy Coburn." McCorkle sang several songs with Coburn, including "Fire On the Mountain," and ended what was to be his final performance with the Marshall Tucker Band song, "Can't You See," before leaving the stage. One week later, doctors discovered McCorkle had stage 4 cancer. Two weeks after his final show with Coburn, George McCorkle died. McCorkle's friends put together a music video using the Coburn-McCorkle version of "Fire On the Mountain" from the "Rev It Up" album to honour his memory.

Three singles from the "Rev It Up" album were released in Southwestern United States: "Hard to be Good in Texas," "Rev It Up," and "Big Dream in a Little Town." All three singles did well on the nationally recognized Texas country music chart, attaining No. 8, No. 10 and No. 26, respectively.

In 2007, Coburn became one of the first female artists to be sponsored by Anheuser-Busch as a Budweiser Concert Series Artist. In 2008 she was presented with a custom designed Budweiser Taylor Guitar in her signature green color. Candy entered her 5th year of Budweiser sponsorship in 2012.

In 2010 Atlanta, Georgia Planet Smoothie became a tour sponsor for Candy Coburn with the introduction of the Pink Warrior smoothie, "Pink Promise," in a campaign entitled, "It's All About the PINK!"

A Texas Roadhouse partnership began in 2011 when the legendary steakhouse restaurants began playing Coburn's songs on the website and on their store jukeboxes across the country, beginning with "Pink Warrior" and "Wrecking Ball." A third song, "Do You Want It," was written and produced by Marc Eric and sung by Candy Coburn for Texas Roadhouse. It was released briefly to radio stations and offered as a free download through Texas Roadhouse. The song continues to be played on store jukeboxes.

The release of Candy's newest project, a 10 track CD entitled Comin' Home, was celebrated at the Missouri State Fair on August 13 and 14, 2012. January 2, 2012, marked the release of a brand new radio version of her single, "Don't Walk Away." Written by Candy along with her guitarist Josh Carroll and friend Josh Long, "Don't Walk Away" was chosen for radio release due to its popularity with audiences across the country since it was introduced to the set list of her live show. The second radio release from the Comin' Home project, "That Thing You Do," was written by Candy Coburn and Josh Carroll and was sent out to radio stations beginning in May 2012. Both singles from the CD were promoted by Nashville-based Jan Woods Promotion and did well on the Music Row Radio Charts.

Candy has been featured in many publications, including IndyCar professional race car driver Sarah Fisher's book released in May 2010 by Beaufort Books, 99 Things Women Wish They Knew Before Getting Behind The Wheel of Their Dream Job,. and she has also been featured on the cover of magazines such as LO Profile Magazine, Erie Life Magazine, and 417 Magazine.

Candy Coburn has been personally managed by the Chief Executive Officer of Triangle Talent Inc., David Snowden, since late 2007. She signed with Creative Artists Agency (CAA) in early 2008 and has enjoyed relationships with many other respected agencies and individuals in the music business. Magda Russell of Right Time Promotion, Public Relations and Digital Media has coordinated Candy's public and online presence since 2006.

Candy has taken her tour to stages of all sizes from coast to coast and has shared the stage with many highly recognized artists, including Montgomery Gentry, Blake Shelton, Brooks & Dunn, Josh Turner, Little Big Town, Lady Antebellum, Charlie Daniels Band, Miranda Lambert, Gary Allen, Zac Brown Band, Darius Rucker and Bret Michaels. Coburn has performed in front of more than 40,000 people at the Susan G. Komen Global Race for the Cure on the National Mall in Washington, D.C., in 2009 and 2010. She has also performed for close to 45,000 at the Charlotte Motor Speedway in 2011, and 110,000 at Churchill Downs.

== Business ventures ==
As the owner of her own company, Candy Productions, LLC, Coburn has branched out her brand out to include her own music label, Loma Jean Records; two publishing companies, CandyWorks Publishing (BMI) and CandyProductions Publishing (ASCAP); commercial jingle company, C&C Audio Arts; Artist Coaching and Workshops programs; and a new company to be launched at the Summer NAMM Show in Nashville in 2014, Gig Armor.
