= Monks of Mellonwah =

Australian musical group

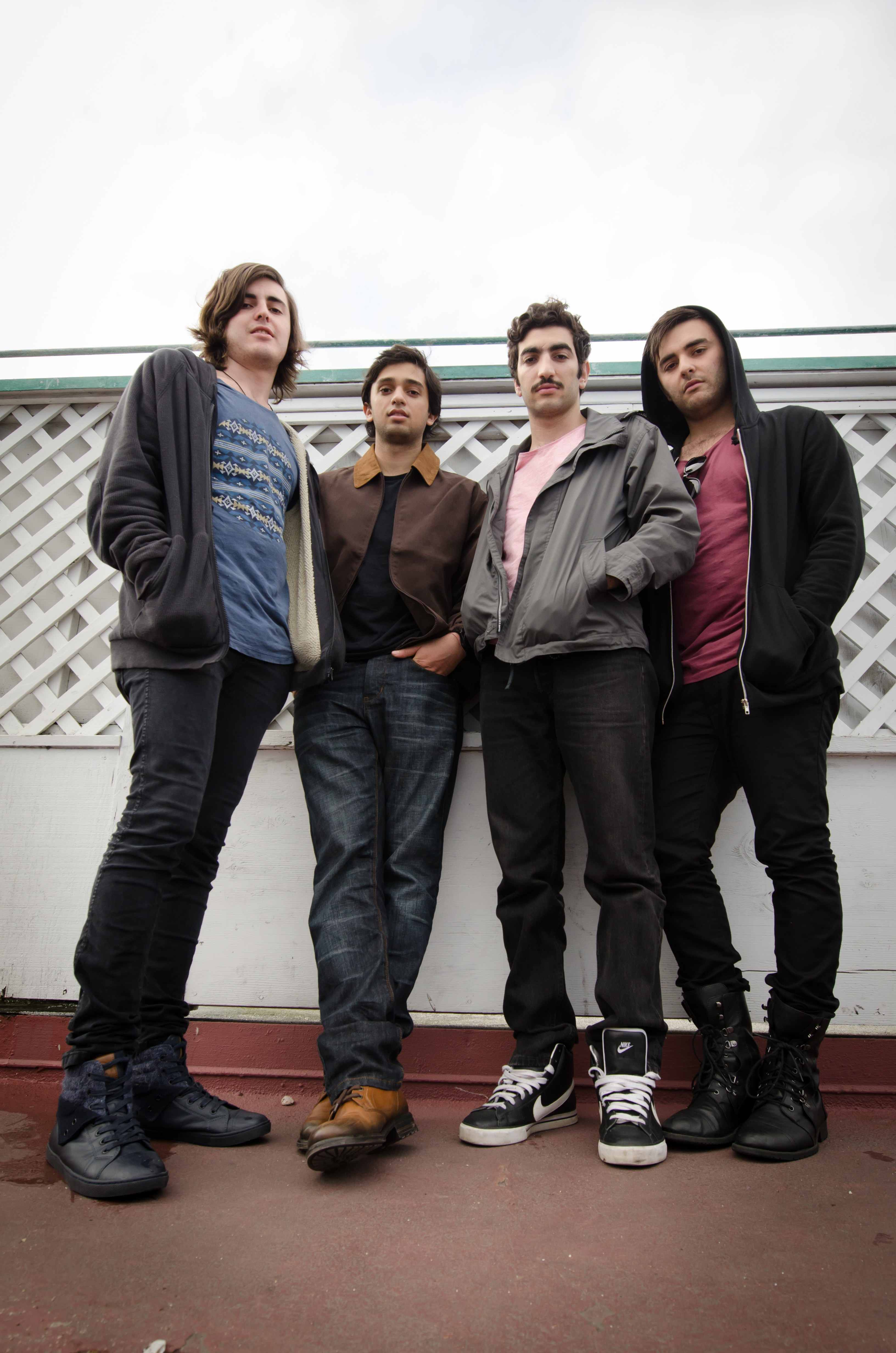

Background information
- Origin: Sydney, Australia
- Genres: Indie rock
- Years active: 2009–present
- Members: Vikram Kaushik (Vocals/Guitar); Joe de la Hoyde (Lead Guitar); John de la Hoyde (Bass); Joshua Baissari (Drums)
- Past members: Will Maher (Vocals)
- Website: www.monksofmellonwah.com

The Monks of Mellonwah (often referred to as MOM) are an Australian indie rock band. Based in Sydney, they have toured nationally and internationally, including in the United States. Their music has received extensive airplay and their videos have been played on networks including MTV and ABC1's RAGE.

== History ==
The Monks as they are known today formed in late 2009 by five members who all attended school together. The original members were Vikram Kaushik, Josh Baissari, William Maher, and brothers John de la Hoyde and Joseph de la Hoyde. The group began writing their own songs and performing in local venues around Sydney.

The group's first EP entitled Stars Are Out was released in 2010 and received significant radio play across Australia. It was recorded with Kaushik on vocals after Maher left the band, and followed in 2011 by the release of their first video for the song Swamp Groove. The video received airplay on ABC1's RAGE and also won a film festival award.

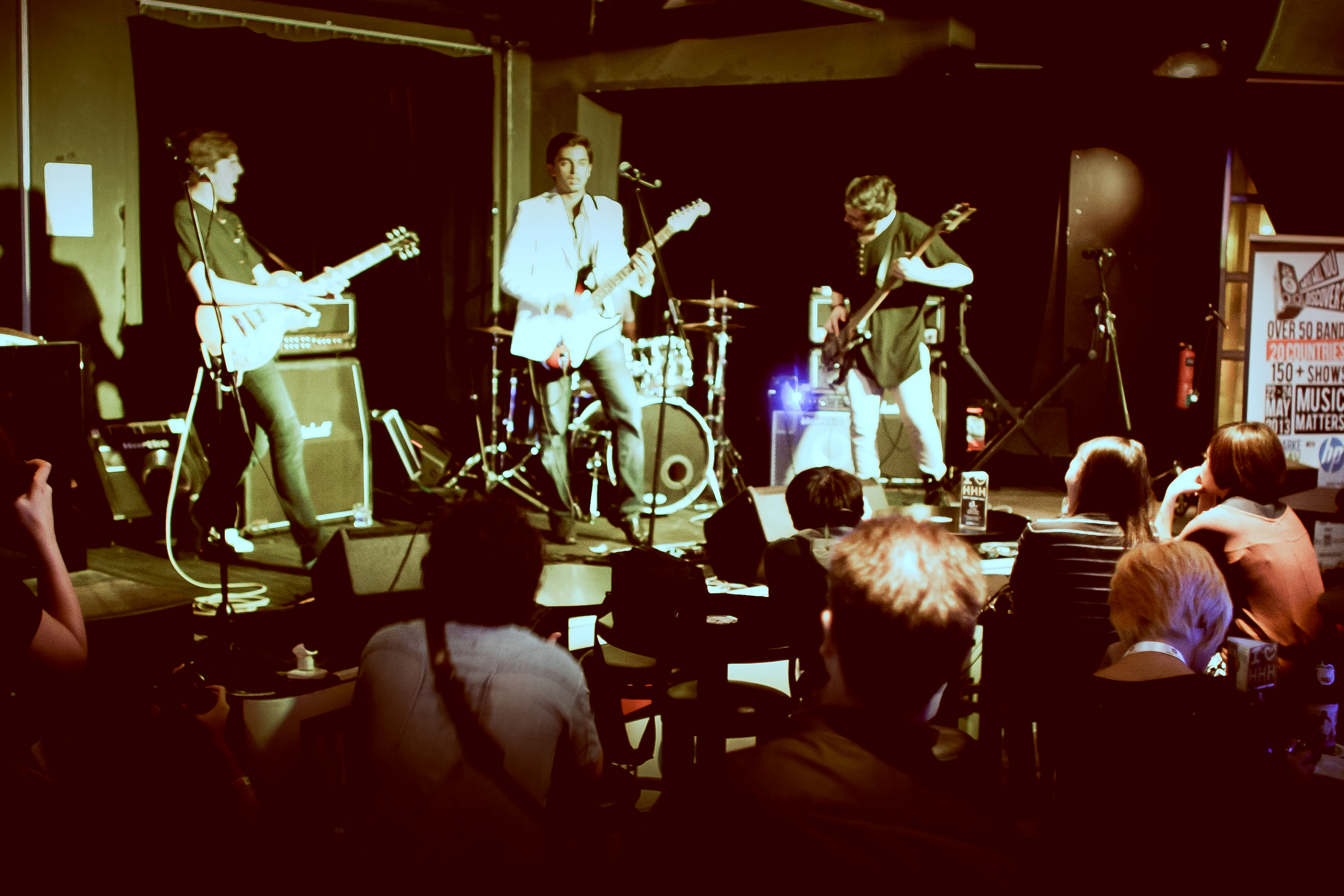
MOM performing at Sounds Australia's Aussie BBQ, Music Matters Singapore, May 2013.

The second EP from the group was released in May 2012 and titled Neurogenesis. It saw the return of Maher after Kaushik had left the band to move overseas. Neurogenesis also saw the band work with Jeff Bova and Howie Weinberg. It was the release of this EP that is said to have earned the group international radio play as well as a tour in both Australia and the United States.

The Monks came to the United States for a second tour in 2012. They launched the tour with Kaushik back in the band after Maher had left for a second time, and included a performance at the 2012 Los Angeles Music Awards where they were also nominated for three awards, taking home the Best International Rock Artist award.

The Monks recorded the album Turn the People in 2012 and 2013. Five tracks on the album were produced by Keith Olsen (Fleetwood Mac & Ozzy Osbourne) and recorded in Los Angeles. It was released in three parts as separate EP releases with a full album release scheduled for 2014. While in Los Angeles, the Monks were featured on Passport Approved, the syndicated radio show hosted by Sat Bisla.

In May 2013, the band played at Singapore's Music Matter's festival alongside other Australian acts Dub FX, Katie Noonan, and Gurrumul. They also signed a development deal to work with A&R Worldwide.

== Music style ==
The Monks are said to be influenced by groups such as Red Hot Chili Peppers, Pink Floyd, Muse, and Queens of the Stone Age. They have also been described as the birth child of bands such as Led Zeppelin.

== Discography ==
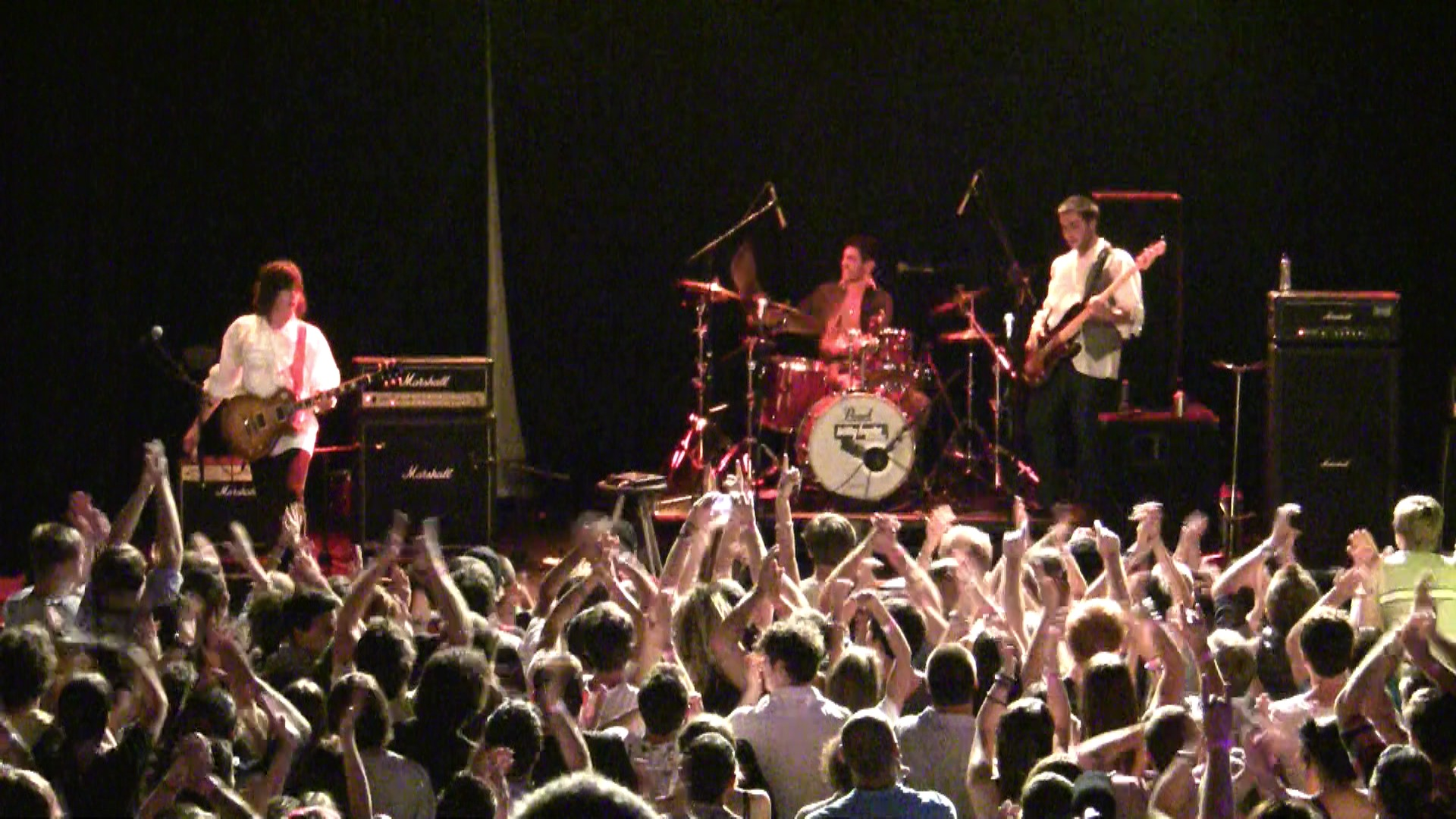
MOM performing at The Metro Theatre, December 2010.

=== Albums ===
- 2014, Turn the People
- 2015, Disconnect

=== EP releases ===
- 2014, Pulse
- 2013, Afraid to Die
- 2013, Ghost Stories
- 2013, Sky and the Dark Night
- 2012, Neurogenesis
- 2010, Stars are Out

=== Singles ===
- 2014, Tear Your Hate Apart
- 2014, Hide Away (Pulse)
- 2015, Never Been Good
- 2015, Even When it Burns
- 2015, Show Me Something More

== Awards and recognition ==
The Monks' first music video which was for the song Swamp Groove won an award at Harold's Shorts Film Festival, being judged by Australian music journalist Glenn A. Baker. In 2012, the Monks won Best Indie Rock Band at the Artist in Music Awards. The same year they won Best International Rock Artist at the L.A. Music Awards.
