= Randy Crouch =

American singer-songwriter

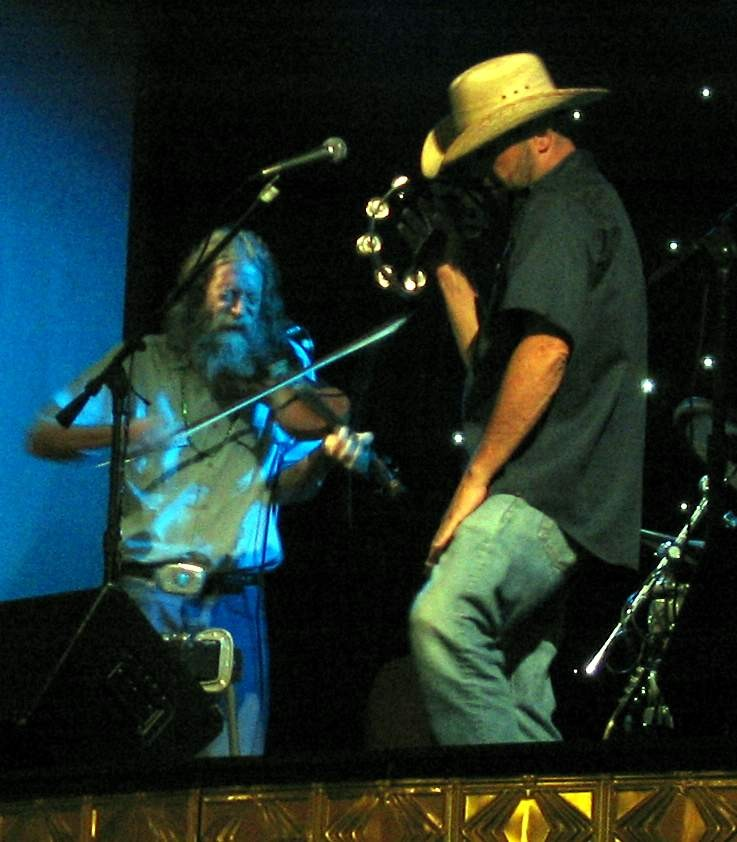
- Crouch performing with John Cooper of the Red Dirt Rangers in 2006

Background information
- Born: Randall Byron Crouch; April 1, 1952 (age 74); Dallas, TX
- Origin: Moodys, Oklahoma
- Genres: Bluegrass; folk; country; red dirt
- Instruments: Violin; guitar
- Years active: 1978-present
- Website: Randy Crouch website

Randy Crouch (born April 1, 1952) is an Oklahoma-based multi-instrumentalist. In eastern Oklahoma, Crouch is best known as a fiddle player. Although he has been referred to as "the world's best rock fiddler," Crouch also plays guitar and pedal steel guitar among other instruments.

== Biography ==
Randy Crouch was born Randall Byron Crouch to mother Ruth Emma McMinn Crouch and father Hurbert Lee Crouch on April 1, 1952, in Dallas, Texas. At the time, his father was attending Southern Methodist Seminary School. He would later go on to be a Methodist preacher. Randy is the oldest of three children. Randy was followed by his sister, now Lisa Perry 18 months later, and by his youngest sibling, Dane Crouch, 18 months after that.

After his father’s graduation, the family moved away from Dallas in 1954 to his first posting in Garden City, Texas. As a preacher, Randy’s father moved the family somewhat frequently. They left Garden City in 1956 to Clyde, Texas in 1956 and to Heat, Texas in 1959. Randy began high school in Canadian, Texas where the family moved in 1962, but they then moved to Crosbyton, Texas where Randy finished out his high school studies.

His parents provided a diverse musical background including piano lessons and Crouch also started playing ukulele and guitar. His grandfather, who played fiddle, had a big influence on him. Crouch learned to play fiddle from a Mel Bay mandolin instruction manual. Since the two instruments are tuned the same – a fiddle lacks the frets that make mandolin playing a little easier to do in key – it all transferred to the fiddle. During his freshman year of high school Crouch started playing in a band and has performed music ever since.

Three of Crouch's biggest musical influences were Jimi Hendrix, The Beatles, and The Rolling Stones. Crouch stated that he is still trying to learn guitar parts to Hendrix' music.

Crouch refers to his songs as "Oklahoma Protest music" and has a long history of protesting against onslaughts against the environment. He lives in an electricity-free geodesic dome that he built on a former landfill site. In 1973, after the Public Service Company of Oklahoma announced that twin black nuclear power plants (named Black Fox 1 and Black Fox 2) would be built, Crouch along with many other Oklahomans took legal action against PSO and a protest movement ensued. As a result of his involvement in the protest, Crouch was blackballed for a time by music promoters in and around Tulsa, although he performed at least 50 "stop Black Fox" events around Oklahoma.

Crouch's music has been a foundation for Oklahoma's Red Dirt music, having been one of the earliest musicians of Red Dirt's epicenter - The Farm - located in Stillwater, Oklahoma. John Cooper, of the Red Dirt Rangers band, said that the camaraderie of the protests was central to the spirit that help form the Red Dirt movement.

Crouch also represents a variation of The Tulsa Sound and has also been a primary influence on aspiring Oklahoma musicians performing bluegrass, folk, country music, and jam bands. In addition to performing as a solo artist, Crouch is a regular member of the Red Dirt Rangers band and is a member of the house band at the annual Woody Guthrie Folk Festival in Okemah, Oklahoma.

Crouch's live performances often include unusual techniques on a variety of instruments. "I once saw him play where he's over a steel guitar and a piano while he's playing fiddle," said Jim Blair, co-owner of Max's Garage and one of Crouch's musical compatriots. "In the middle of the song, he wants to tune up the fiddle, so he hits the A note on the piano with his fiddle bow and tunes the string and keeps on playing."

Crouch's songs "Big Shot Rich Man" and "Mexican Holiday" have been recorded by Jason Boland & the Stragglers. He played with Tulsa band South 40 when they recorded his song "Got Time to Party" for their 2006 release Home which also features guest spots by members of Asleep at the Wheel and George Strait's band. As a member of the Vince Herman Trio, Crouch performs with alumni of the jam bands Leftover Salmon and Ekoostik Hookah.

Crouch has been nominated for over twenty Oklahoma State Music Awards and in 2005 was inducted into the Oklahoma Music Awards Red Dirt Hall of Fame.

== Discography ==
Year	Title	Record label/Comments
2017	Turn Off Tune Out Drop In	Random Choice Music - Album
2014	No Good Reason	Random Choice Music - Album
2012	Me and You	Random Choice Music - Album
2010	It's a Crime	Random Choice Music - Album
2009	Just a Few More Things	
2008	Straight From the Tap	with Badwater
2006	Friends	with Wanda Watson
2006	Home	with South 40
2004	Kindred Spirits	Binky Records (with Bob Childers)
2004	Natural Selection	
2004	Somewhere in the Middle	Smith Music Group (with Jason Boland & the Stragglers)
2003	What's Goin' On?	
2002	Travelin' On	
2001	Truckstop Diaries	Sustain Records (with Jason Boland & the Stragglers)
1998	Unplugged	with the Lisa Sisters
1999	Pearl Snaps	Sustain Records (with Jason Boland & the Stragglers)
1998	Canyon Rose	with Lisa Perry
1998	Angel Rose	with Lisa Perry
1997	It's Too Bad	Random Choice (with Flying Horse)
1996	The Flying Horse Opera	Mars Records
1995	Take Two	
1992	Fractal Rose	with Lisa Perry
1990	The Road to Good Intentions	Random Choice Music
1983	Colorslide	
