= Jason Boland & The Stragglers =

American musical group

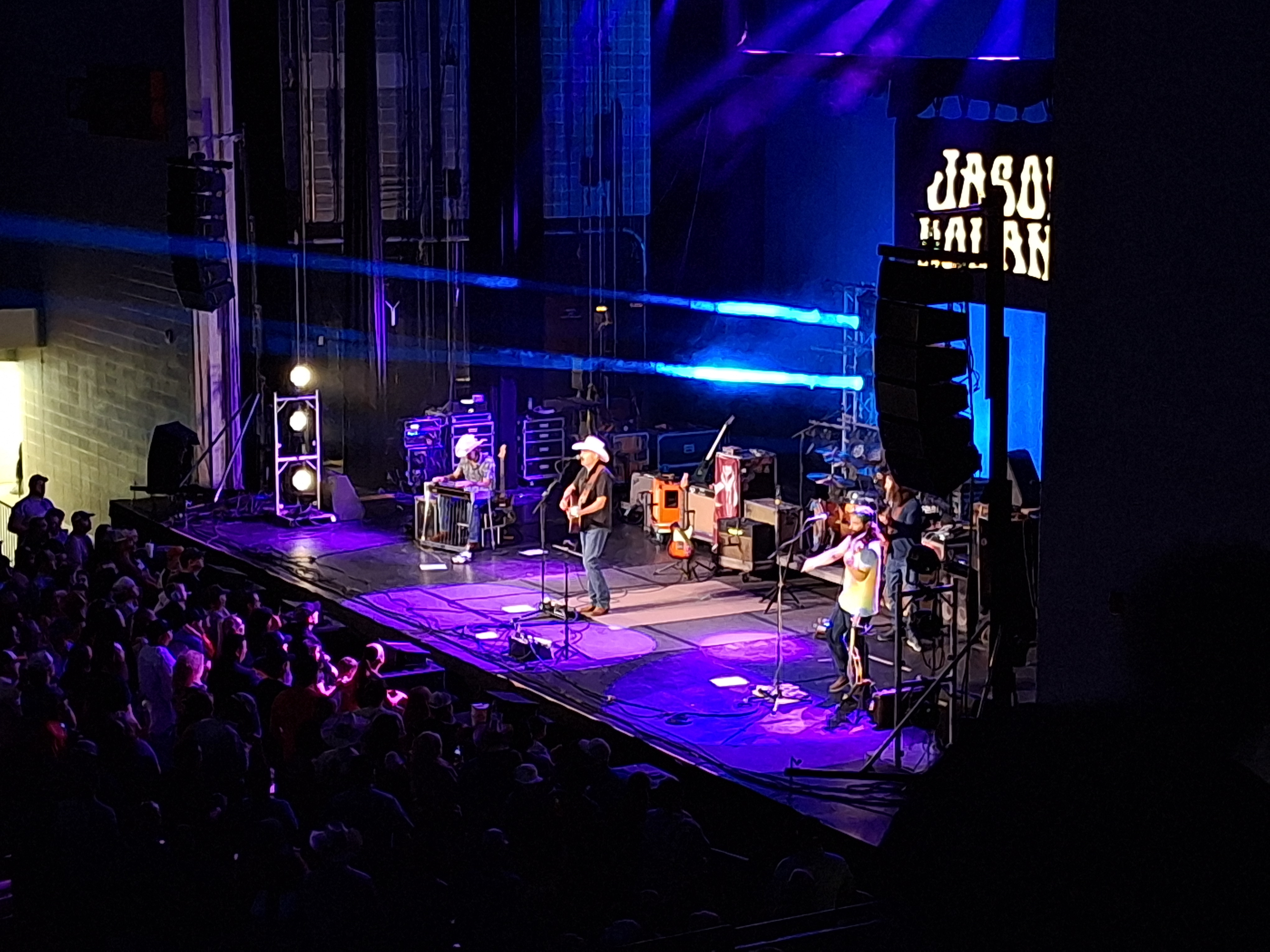
- Jason Boland & The Stragglers performing in Muskogee, Oklahoma on June 6, 2025.

Background information
- Origin: Harrah, Oklahoma, U.S.
- Genres: Red dirt, Texas country
- Years active: 1998–present
- Label: Proud Souls Entertainment
- Members: Jason Boland; Grant Tracy; Nick Gedra; Chris Compton; Nic”Klaus” Hamburg
- Past members: Jake Lynn; Andrew Bair; AJ Slaughter; Roger Dale Ray; Dana Hazzard; Jeremy Watkins; Nick Worley; Noah Jeffries; Cody Angel; Brad Rice
- Website: thestragglers.com

Jason Boland & The Stragglers is an American red dirt / Texas country band featuring Harrah, Oklahoma native Jason Boland (lead vocalist and guitar), Grant Tracy (bass), Nick Gedra (fiddle and mandolin), Chris Compton (drums and background vocals), and Nicklaus Hamburg (steel and electric guitars).

== Career ==
Jason Boland and Brad Rice are both members of the Lambda Chi Alpha fraternity, having met in Stillwater, Oklahoma, while attending Oklahoma State University. Grant Tracy has a degree in Respiratory Therapy from Arkansas Valley Tech Institute. Boland formed a band in 1998, releasing their first album, Pearl Snaps, in 1999. Boland and The Stragglers became one of the most successful artists in the Red Dirt/Texas Country scene. Studio albums Truckstop Diaries and Somewhere in the Middle followed in 2001 and 2004, respectively; a concert at Fort Worth, Texas, dancehall Billy Bob's Texas was recorded for Live and Lit at Billy Bob's Texas in 2002.

The Bourbon Legend was released on Bruce Robison's Sustain Records label in late 2006. It was produced by longtime Dwight Yoakam collaborator Pete Anderson.

In 2007, Jason Boland co-produced the album Choices for the band Hazzard. The band's front man, Dana Hazzard, was the original fiddle player for the Stragglers.

In 2008, just before the release of the album Comal County Blue, Boland ruptured a vocal cord. The injury almost caused him to permanently lose his singing voice, but after surgery and resting his voice, he recovered.

According to Katie Key, editor of the Texas Music Chart, "Comal County Blue" was the fastest-growing single in 2008 from an independent label. On April 20, 2010, the band released their second live album, entitled High in the Rockies: A Live Album. The recordings come from four live concerts over four days from January 7, 2010, to January 10, 2010. The shows were performed in Steamboat Springs, Colorado, Ft. Collins, Colorado, Laramie, Wyoming, and Denver, Colorado, respectively.

The band released Dark & Dirty Mile on May 14, 2013. Shooter Jennings (son of country music artist Waylon Jennings) co-produced the album with the band. The title track was a top-five single on the Texas Music chart in May 2013.

Longtime guitarist Roger Ray announced in December 2014 that he would be leaving The Stragglers for family and personal reasons. He has been succeeded by Cody Angel. Their album Squelch, released in 2015, had its best debut on the Top Country Albums chart, where it reached No. 11, selling 4,200 for the week.

The band is currently based in Austin, Texas.

The band released the concept album The Light Saw Me on December 3, 2021, produced by Shooter Jennings. The Light Saw Me follows the story of a Texas cowboy who is abducted by aliens in the 1890s and is dropped back off in Texas in the 1990s. Through this unconventional setting, Boland explores philosophical and religious themes.

== Discography ==
=== Studio albums ===
| Title | Album details | Peak chart positions | | | |
| Title | Album details | US Country | US | US Heat | US Indie |
|---|---|---|---|---|---|
| Pearl Snaps | Release date: October 16, 1999; Label: Smith Music Group | — | — | — | — |
| Truckstop Diaries | Release date: August 7, 2001; Label: Tenkiller Records | — | — | — | — |
| Somewhere in the Middle | Release date: September 21, 2004; Label: Smith Music Group | 65 | — | — | — |
| The Bourbon Legend | Release date: October 31, 2006; label: Sustain Records | 67 | — | — | — |
| Comal County Blue | Release date: August 26, 2008; Label: Thirty Tigers | 30 | 160 | 2 | 19 |
| Rancho Alto | Release date: October 4, 2011; Label: Thirty Tigers/Proud Souls | 26 | 130 | 3 | 21 |
| Dark & Dirty Mile | Release date: May 14, 2013; Label: Thirty Tigers | 25 | 89 | — | 18 |
| Squelch | Release date: October 9, 2015; Label: Thirty Tigers | 11 | 136 | — | 12 |
| Hard Times are Relative | Release Date: May 18, 2018; Label: Thirty Tigers | — | — | — | — |
| The Light Saw Me | Release Date: December 3, 2021; Label: Thirty Tigers | — | — | — | — |
| The Last Kings of Babylon | Release Date: March 14, 2025; Label: Proud Souls | | | | |
"—" denotes releases that did not chart

=== Live albums ===
| Title | Album details | Peak chart positions | | | |
| Title | Album details | US Country | US | US Heat | US Indie |
|---|---|---|---|---|---|
| Live and Lit at Billy Bob's Texas | Release date: October 29, 2002; Label: Smith Music Group | — | — | — | — |
| High in the Rockies: A Live Album | Release date: April 20, 2010; Label: Thirty Tigers | 27 | 136 | 3 | 21 |
| Live from Cain's Ballroom | Release date: June 8, 2024; Label: Thirty Tigers/Proud Souls | — | — | — | — |
"—" denotes releases that did not chart

=== Music videos ===
| Year | Video | Director |
|---|---|---|
| 2010 | "Tulsa Time" | Jeff Horny |
| 2021 | "The Light Saw Me" | Jace Kartye |

== Honors and awards ==
=== 2025 Oklahoma Music Hall of Fame Inductions ===
The Oklahoma Music Hall of Fame inducted Stoney LaRue, Jason Boland & The Stragglers, The Great Divide, and Cross Canadian Ragweed during a special ceremony held on Saturday, April 12, 2025, during the Boys from Oklahoma concert series.

The induction took place between performances by the Turnpike Troubadours and Cross Canadian Ragweed, celebrating the legacy and influence of Oklahoma’s Red Dirt music scene. All four inductees are regarded as pioneers of the genre, known for shaping the musical identity of the region.
