= Bob Childers =

American singer-songwriter

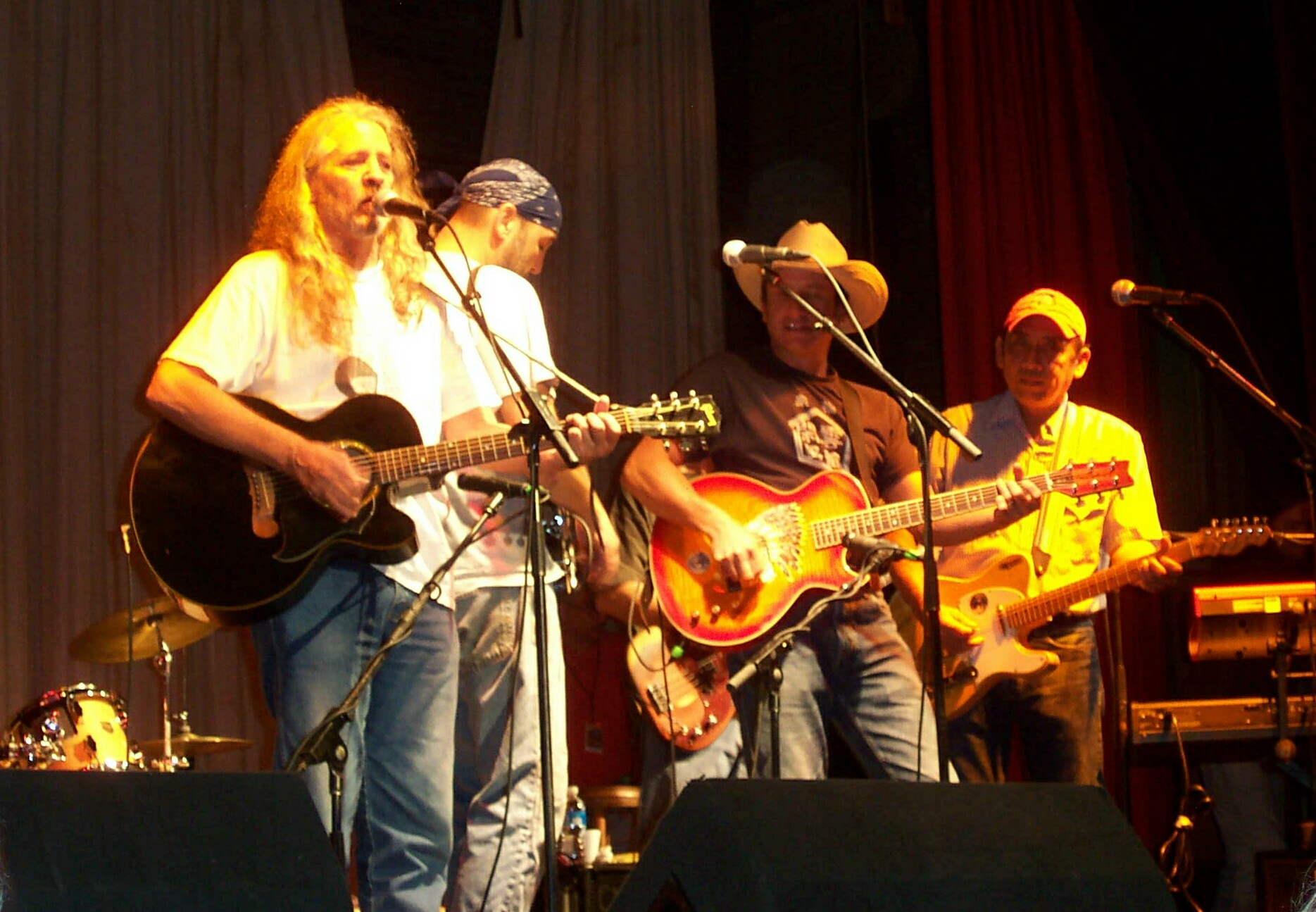
- Bob Childers on stage with the Red Dirt Rangers (John Cooper, Brad Piccolo, Ben Han) at the Woody Guthrie Folk Festival; July 11, 2007

Background information
- Born: November 20, 1946; West Union, West Virginia
- Origin: Ponca City, Oklahoma, US
- Died: April 22, 2008 (aged 61) Stillwater, Oklahoma
- Genres: Red dirt, country, folk, bluegrass
- Occupations: Singer-songwriter, guitarist
- Instruments: Vocals, guitar
- Years active: 1978–2008
- Labels: Binky Records, Smith Music
- Formerly of: Woody Guthrie, Jason Boland, Cross Canadian Ragweed, Randy Crouch, The Red Dirt Rangers, No Justice
- Website: Binky Records

Robert Wayne Childers (November 20, 1946 – April 22, 2008) was an American country-folk musician and singer-songwriter from the state of Oklahoma. Both before and after his death, he achieved widespread critical acclaim having been compared to songwriters such as Bob Dylan and Woody Guthrie. Childers is often labeled the "father", "grandfather", or "godfather" of the regional Oklahoman music scene known as Red Dirt music.

== Biography and works ==
Childers was born on November 20, 1946, in West Union, West Virginia, to parents Howard and Rhea (Gaskins) Childers. At the age of seven, he and his family moved to Ponca City, Oklahoma. He developed an interest in music and started playing guitar at age 16. After graduating from Ponca City High School, he moved even further west to study music in Berkeley, California. After a stint in California, Childers returned to Oklahoma, this time to Stillwater, where he found "people interested in the natural and supernatural aspects of life and love, and folks not afraid to sing about it."

Childers emerged in 1979 with his debut album titled I Ain't No Jukebox which he recorded with help from friend Jimmy LaFave. The album received many positive reviews and led Childers to begin touring nationwide. In March 1979, the Three Mile Island nuclear reactor disaster took place. Protestors of Three Mile Island, having heard Childers' song "Sunshine, Wind and Water," invited him to perform at a no-nukes rally in Washington, DC. Childers performed before Arlo Guthrie and Pete Seeger in front of a crowd estimated to be 65,000 to 100,000 people.

His second album, Singing Trees, Dancing Waters, was recorded in 1982 and released on March 30, 1983. Afterwards, he relocated to Nashville, Tennessee.

In 1986, Childers released two albums: Four Horsemen and a collection of instrumental works entitled King David's Lament. While many of his peers had success in Nashville, Childers chose to relocate to Austin, Texas. He then released Circles Toward the Sun (1990). By 1991 Childers had relocated again, back to Oklahoma where he released Nothin' More Natural (1996), Hat Trick (1999) and a fan club collection of rarities La vita è bella – Outtakes, Demos and Jams 1980 – 1988 (2000.) His return to Oklahoma facilitated collaboration with other Red Dirt music artists including Dirt & Spirit with The Great Divide (1999), Two Buffalos Walking – Live at the Blue Door with Terry "Buffalo" Ware (2003), Kindred Spirits with Randy Crouch (2004) and Ride for the Cimarron with Jason Boland and the Stragglers (2006.)

In 2003, Jimmy LaFave produced a Woody Guthrie tribute show called Ribbon of Highway, Endless Skyway. The ensemble show toured around the country and included a rotating cast of singer-songwriters individually performing Guthrie's songs. Interspersed between songs were Guthrie's philosophical writings read by Childers, sometimes called the "Dylan of the dust", who served as the show's narrator.

== Later years and death ==
By 2004, Childers' health was in decline. A long-time smoker, Childers suffered from numerous lung-related ailments including pneumonia and chronic obstructive pulmonary disease (often referred to as "lung disease"). To help Childers with his medical bills, Chris Maxwell of Binky Records spearheaded an effort to raise funds. The result was the 2004 triple-CD compilation album entitled Restless Spirits: A Tribute to the Songs of Bob Childers. The collection features tracks from over fifty performers who donated versions of Childers' songs recorded at their own expense. Childers succumbed to his illnesses on April 22, 2008, in Stillwater, Oklahoma.

== Tributes and legacy ==
Five years prior to his death, Childers was inducted into the Oklahoma Music Awards Red Dirt Hall of Fame along with Steve Ripley and Tom Skinner. In an interview with The Current in 2007, Childers said of his songwriting, "I just keep it honest and keep it simple. There really is no secret to writing a song." Even before the release of the tribute box-set Restless Spirits, Childers influence on other songwriters was pervasive. The Tulsa World reported that Bob Childers songs have been recorded by more than 200 artists. Many musicians have stated that Childers served as a mentor. Bassist-guitarist Bob Wiles said of Childers, "He was the first older, respected musician to take us seriously, probably when we didn't deserve it. And he encouraged us to take ourselves seriously. He's done that with a lot of bands. Bob is that common thread through us all." When asked what it was like to be a mentor to so many aspiring singer-songwriters, Childers said, "I don't know if that's a good thing or not. It makes me try a little harder, knowing that people are being influenced. It makes me try to do right a little bit more."

Childers was a regular at the Woody Guthrie Folk Festival held every July in Guthrie's hometown of Okemah, Oklahoma. At the 10th annual festival in July 2007, seven "10-year artists" – artists who had participated every year since the festival's inception – performed at a benefit show titled "In the Spirit of Woody Guthrie". Artists included Jimmy LaFave, Don Conoscenti, Ellis Paul, Joel Rafael, Terry "Buffalo" Ware, the Red Dirt Rangers, and Childers.

On July 8, 2008, a special pre-festival Childers tribute show was held at Cain's Ballroom in Tulsa on the evening before the official start of the festival. Performers included Jimmy LaFave, The Burns Sisters, the Red Dirt Rangers, Mike McClure, Joel Rafael, Stoney LaRue and Tom Skinner. In addition, the festival program booklet included a special Bob Childers Memorial Page, and quotes made by his songwriting friends were interspersed as tributes throughout. The Tulsa World announced that Childers would be inducted into the Oklahoma Music Hall of Fame in October 2008 at a gala to be held in Muskogee, Oklahoma. The induction ceremony, held at the Muskogee Civic Center, took place on October 8, 2008. The Red Dirt Rangers and Tom Skinner accepted the award on behalf of Childers.
