= Sam Houston Race Park =

Horse racing track in Texas

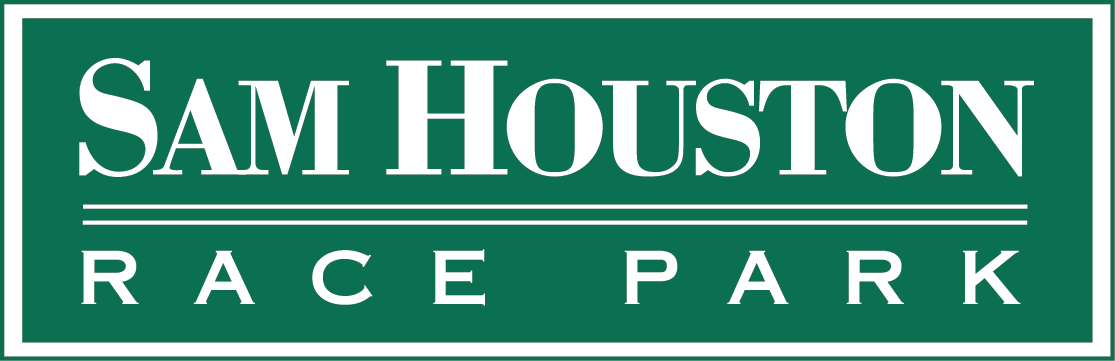
- The Stakes Have Never Been Bigger
- Location: Houston, Texas
- Coordinates: 29°55′49.53″N 95°31′43.23″W
- Owned by: Penn Entertainment
- Date opened: April 24, 1994
- Capacity: 20,000
- Race type: Thoroughbred and Quarter Horse
- Course type: Dirt & Turf

Sam Houston Race Park is a horse racing track located in unincorporated northwest Houston, Texas, United States. The park hosts both Thoroughbred and American Quarter Horse racing each year. The track strives to be a multi-purpose venue, hosting many festivals and events during its off seasons.

== History ==
Sam Houston opened on April 24, 1994, and was the first Class 1 Horse Racing venue constructed in Texas. It cost approximately $90 million to construct. The Park was considered the fastest growing race track in America based on handle growth and quality of racing program over the past year several years. The Park is named for Sam Houston who was an influential general and later president of the Republic of Texas. Kirwin Drouet, the original founder of Sam Houston Race Park, named the Park after him because of his significance to Texas and the fact that the track is located in Houston on Sam Houston Tollway (Beltway 8).

Sam Houston bought Valley Race Park, a greyhound track in Harlingen, in 2000.

Sam Houston Race Park's largest attendance was recorded on July 4, 2008 with an attendance of 32,177.

In August 2017 Sam Houston opened its doors to the equine victims of Hurricane Harvey. The facility made it through the disaster with little damage and flooding, so they offered refuge to over 200 displaced horses in the Houston area. Their racing barns were empty at the time due to the live racing season having already ended for the year.

In 2023, wagering declined 91 percent after they were no longer to export their signal to any other states due to an ongoing fight between HISA and the Texas Racing Commission.

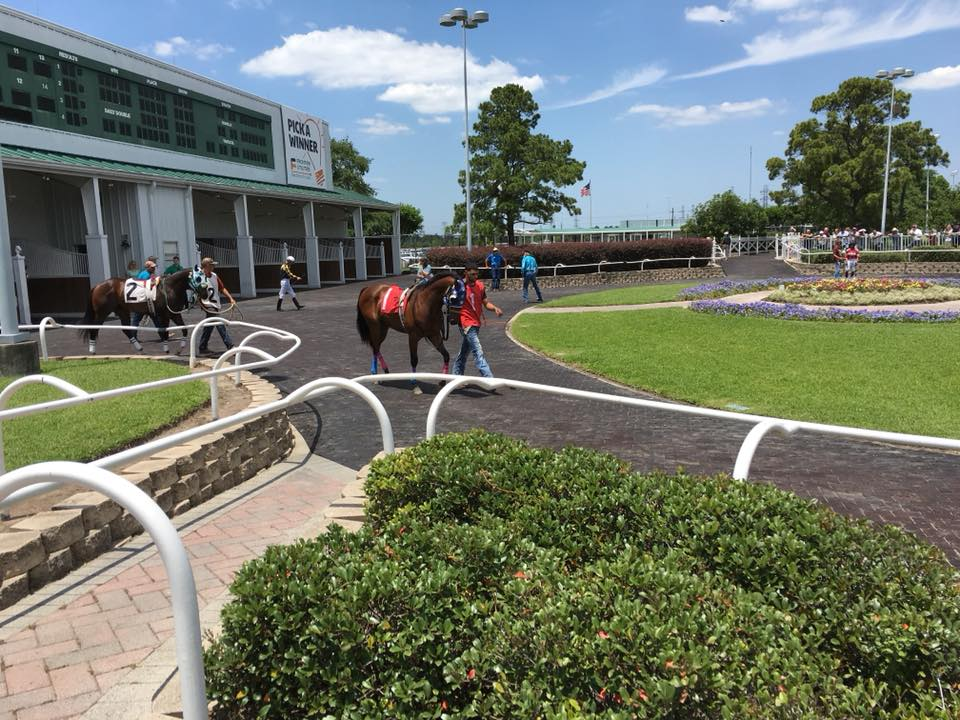
Horses in the Sam Houston Race Park paddock.

== Races at Sam Houston ==
The race track hosts two live race meets annually. Thoroughbred horse racing runs from January through early April. American Quarter Horse races are held from late April through early June. The rest of the year the Park is open for simulcast racing around the world. The races run the gambit of maiden special weights and claiming to graded stakes and handicaps.

Among many others, these are the races Sam Houston Race Park holds each year along with their purses:

Quarter Horse

Open:

- $100,000 Sam Houston Futurity (G2) 2YO - 330 Yds
- $95,000 B.O.A. TX Challenge Championship (G2) 3 & Up - 440 Yds
- $50,000 Sam Houston Classic (G2) 3 & Up - 440 Yds
- $35,000 Sam Houston Derby (G3) 3YO - 350 Yds
- $35,000 John Deere TX Juvenile Challenge (G3) 2YO - 350 Yds
- $35,000 Adequan Texas Derby Challenge 3YO - 400 Yds
- $25,000 Sam Houston Juvenile Stakes 2YO - 330 Yds
- $25,000 Governor's Cup Marathon 3 & Up - 870 Yds
- $20,000 Harris County Stakes 3 & Up - 550 Yds

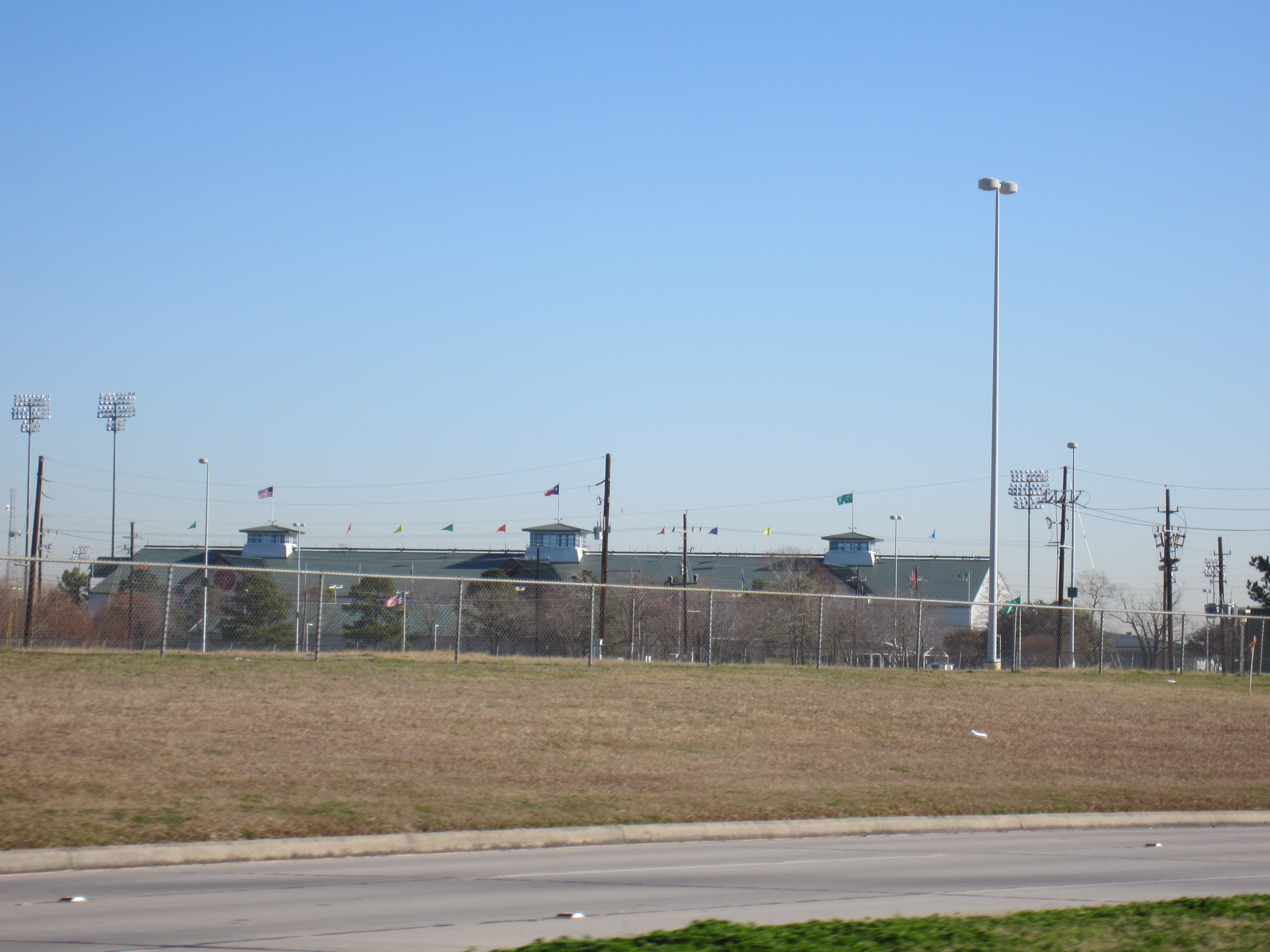
The race park in 2014

Filly/Mare:

- $20,000 Miss Sam Houston Stakes F/M 3 & Up - 330 Yds
- $22,000 Merial Texas Distaff Challenge F/M 3 & Up - 400 Yds

American Paint Horse

- $15,000 Colors of Texas Paint Maturity (G2) 3 & Up - 350 Yds
- $15,000 Colors of Houston Paint Juvenile 2YO 300 - Yds

Thoroughbred

Open:

- $200,000 John B. Connally Turf Cup (Listed) 4 & Up
- $100,000 Bob Bork Texas Turf Mile 3YO
- $75,000 Pulse Power Turf Sprint 4 & Up
- $50,000 Sam Houston Sprint Cup 4 & Up
- $50,000 Houston Turf Stakes 4 & Up (T)
- $50,000 Bucharest Turf Sprint 4 & Up (T)
- $50,000 Groovy Stakes 3YO
- $50,000 Space City Stakes 3YO
- $50,000 Richard King Turf Stakes 4 & Up (T)
- $50,000 Spirit of Texas Stakes 4 & Up
- $50,000 Star of Texas Stakes 4 & Up
- $45,000 Texas Heritage Stakes 3YO (T)
- $45,000 Jersey Village Stakes 4 & Up (T)
- $30,000 Allen's Landing Stakes 3YO

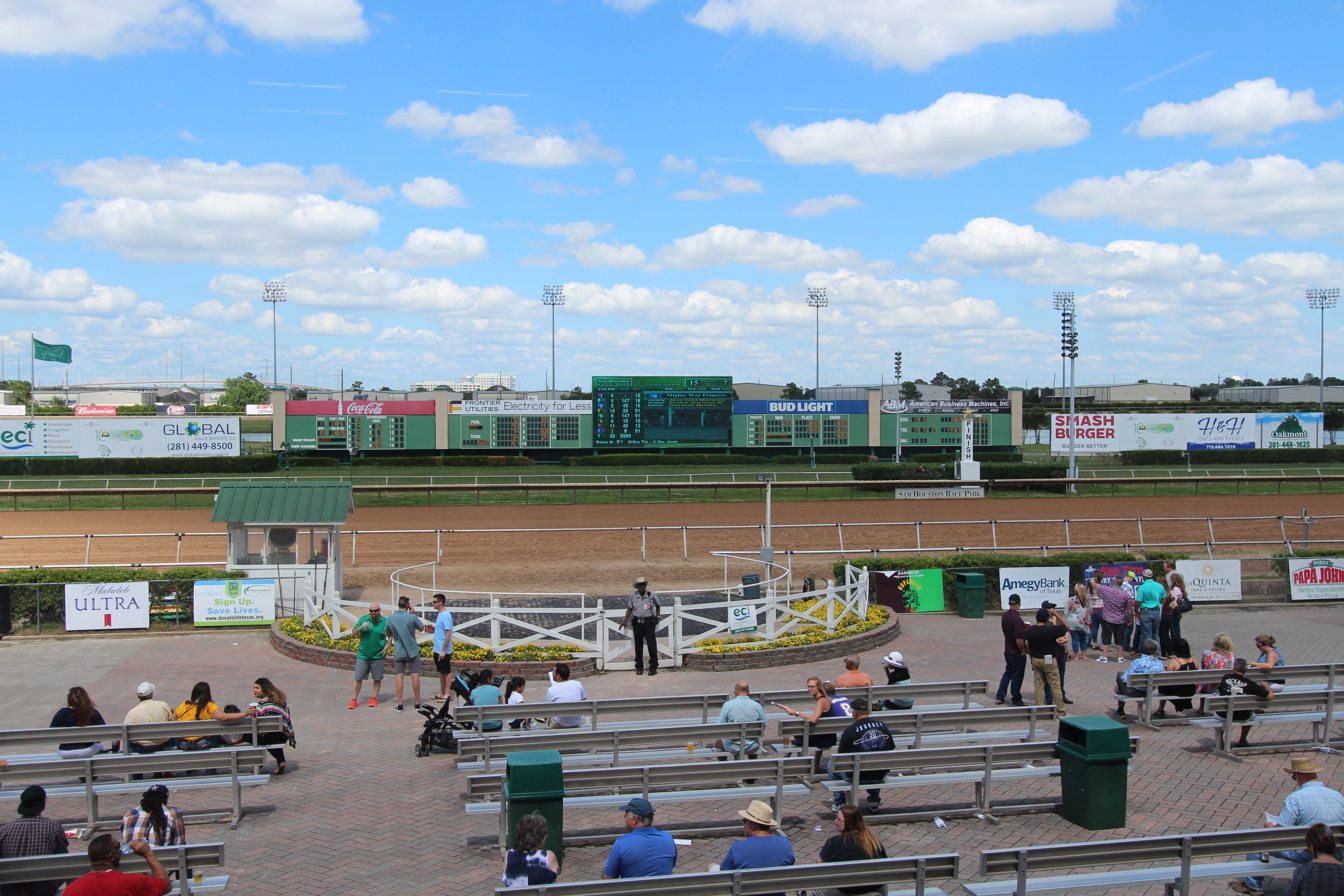
Sam Houston's Winner's Circle.

Colt/Gelding:

- $75,000 Jim's Orbit Stakes 3YO

Filly/Mare:

- $400,000 Houston Ladies Classic (G3) F/M 4 & Up (inaugurated in 2013)
- $75,000 Two Altazano Stakes F 3YO
- $50,000 Houston Distaff F/M 4 & Up (T)
- $75,000 Jersey Lilly Turf Stakes F/M 4 & Up (T)
- $50,000 San Jacinto Turf Stakes F/M 4 & Up
- $50,000 Bara Lass Stakes F 3YO
- $45,000 Tomball Stakes F/M 4 & Up (T)

Discontinued:

- $75,000 Martanza Stakes F 3YO
- $45,000 Mission Stakes F/M 4 & Up
- $45,000 Sam Houston Oaks F 3YO
- $45,000 Fort Bend Country Stakes 3YO
- $45,000 Spring Stakes 3YO
- $25,000 Texans Juvenile Stakes 2YO
- $25,000 Buffalo Bayou Stakes 4 & Up

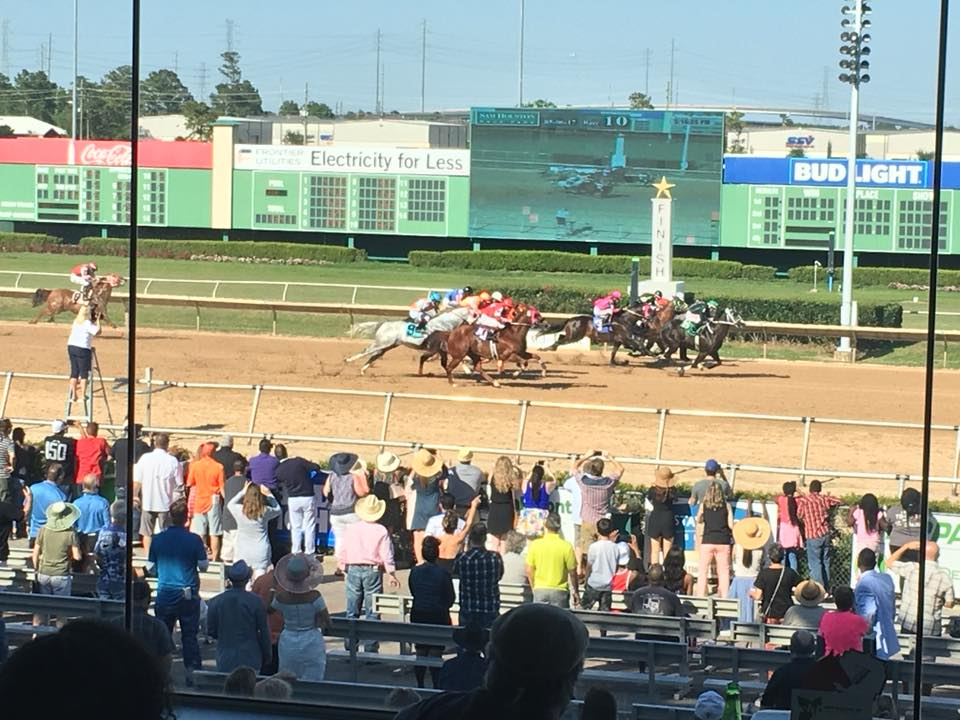
Horses crossing the finish line at Sam Houston.

Arabian

Open:

- $45,000 Amethyst Jewel (G1) 4 & Up - 7 F

Colt/Gelding:

- $30,000 Texas Six Shooter (G2) C/G 4 & Up - 7 F

Filly/Mare:

- $38,500 Sheikha Mubarack LWC F/M 4 & Up 7 F
- $30,000 Texas Yellow Rose (G2) F/M 4 & Up - 7 F

== Amenities ==
Along with the 1-mile dirt track and 7-furlong turf course for the horses, Sam Houston Race Park offers 8 bars, 2 restaurants, Grandstand luxury suites: San Jacinto Suite, Celebration Suite, Director's Suite, Sam Houston Suite, and numerous House Suites. The park contains many concession areas on the Paddock and Club levels.

== Events ==
=== Concerts ===
Sam Houston Race Park hosts many concerts throughout each year. Each year the park hosts the ZiegenBock Music Festival, a smaller version of the Lone Star State Jam held in Austin, TX. A compilation of country music's finest artists and many of the up-and-coming start of Texas country music brings thousands out to Sam Houston Race Park each year for the festival. The strong history of concerts at Sam Houston Race Park includes names such as Gary Allan, the Grammy nominated Eli Young Band, Randy Rogers Band, Willie Nelson, Lynyrd Skynyrd, and international acts such as Hadiqa Kiani along with many more.

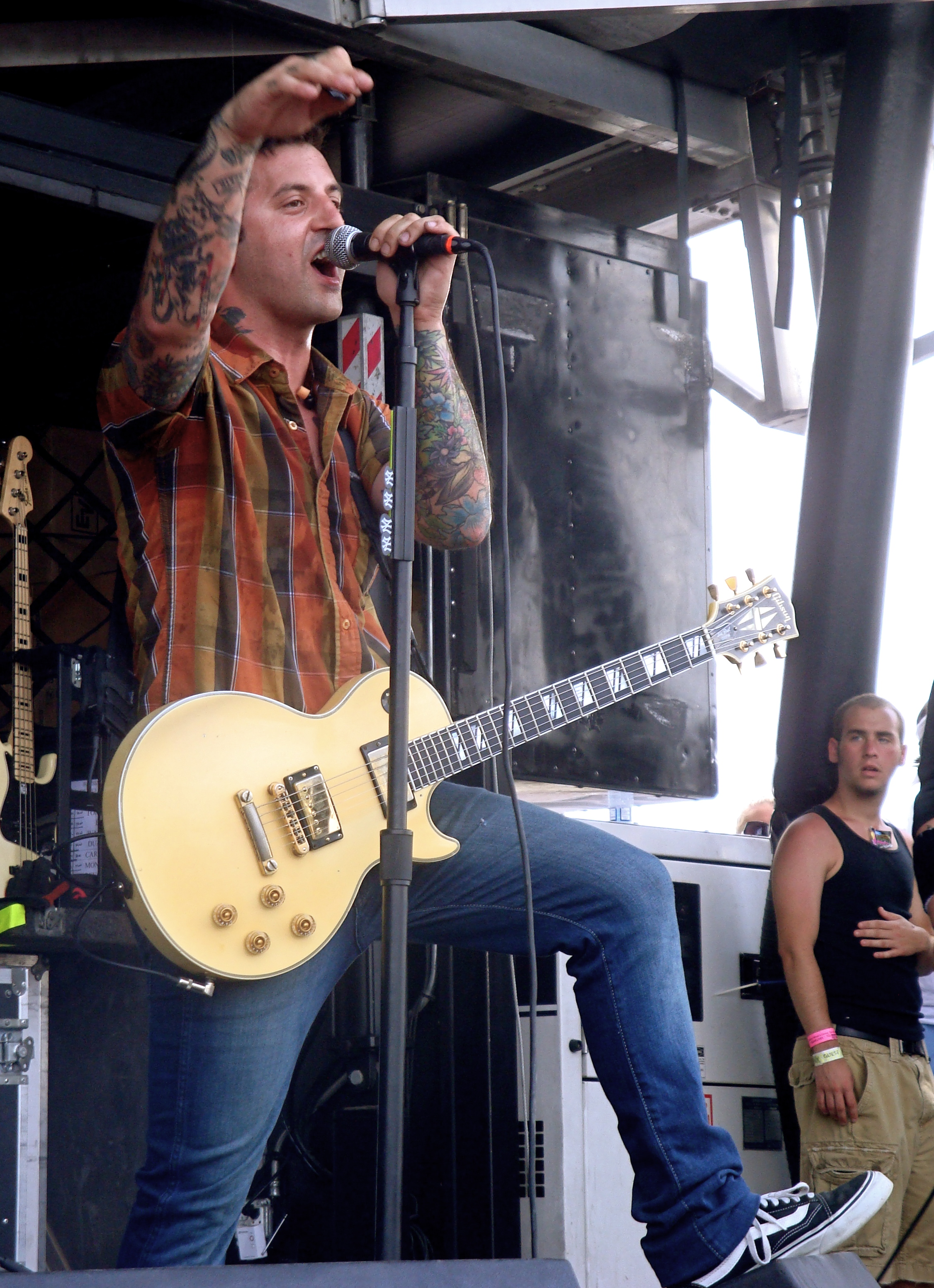
Anthony Raneri performing at the 2009 Vans Warped Tour in Houston, TX at the Sam Houston Race Park

=== Wiener Dog and Corgi Dog Racing ===
One of the many light hearted events is the annual Wiener Dog and Corgi Dog Races, a family friendly event. Several races are held throughout the day in between the live horse races. This event is usually held in February for Wiener Dog and May for Corgi Dogs.

=== Annual Food Truck Festival ===
A new addition to the park's list of events is the Annual Food Truck Festival which brings together many small business for a day of food and games for families. The food spans several cultures including; Mexican, Cajun, Italian, Greek, Americana, and many more. There is also dessert truck and a craft beer tasting from local breweries available.

=== Guitars N' Cars Auto Show ===
Guitars N' Cars Auto Show, presented by the Houston Construction Industry Charities (hosted by Sam Houston Race Park), is an annual car show with live music, food, and guitar vendors. All proceeds from Guitars N' Cars auto show go to help the Houston US Vets program to honor the veterans of Houston.

=== Camel & Ostrich Races ===
The annual Camel & Ostrich Races have become a fan favorite, normally held on a Friday and Saturday evening in early March during the Thoroughbred Meet. One race with Ostriches and one race with Camels are held between live horse races on each night. Both Ostriches and Camels carry riders during their races. There is no wagering permitted by law on the Wieners, Camels or Ostriches.

== Gallery ==
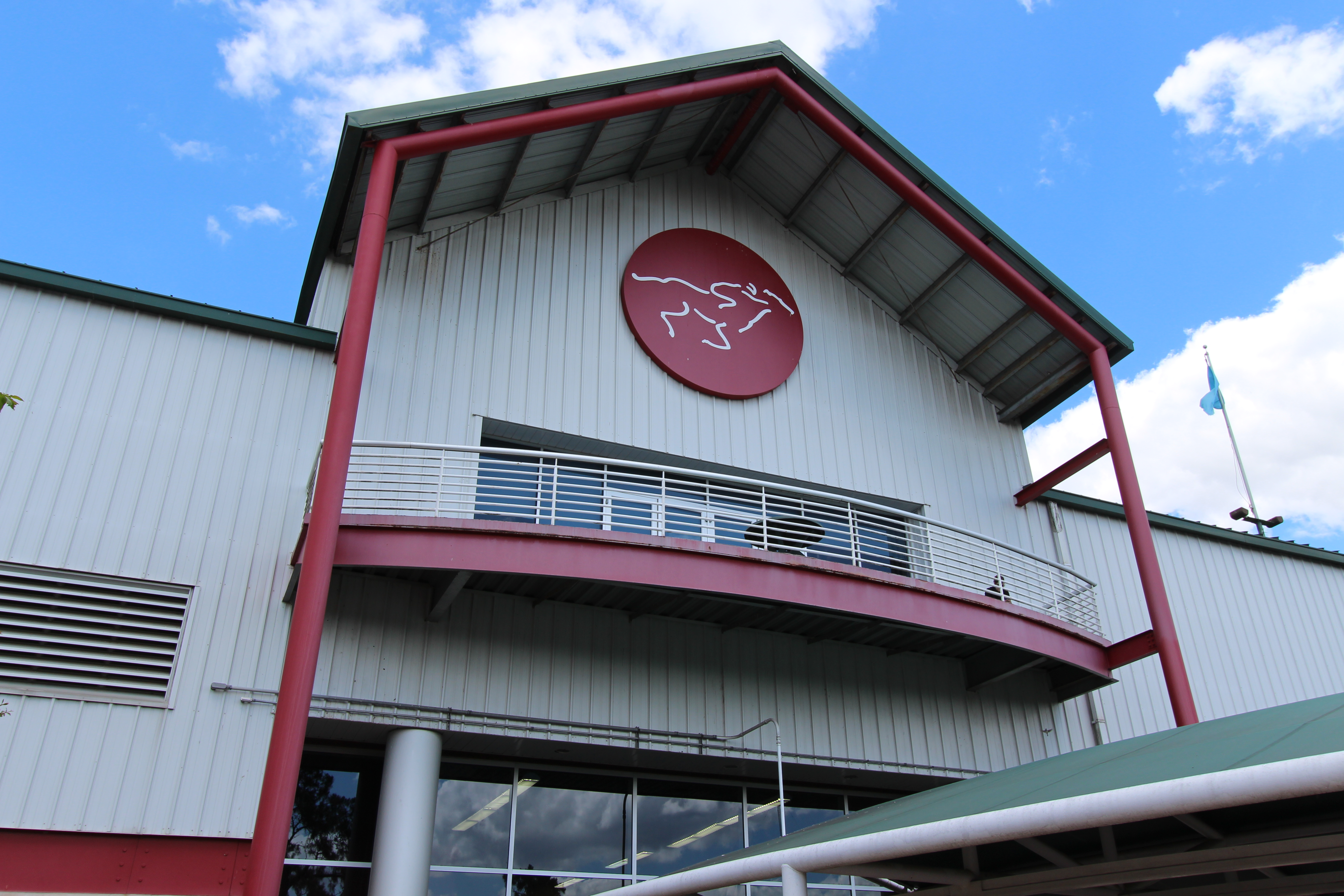
South Entrance

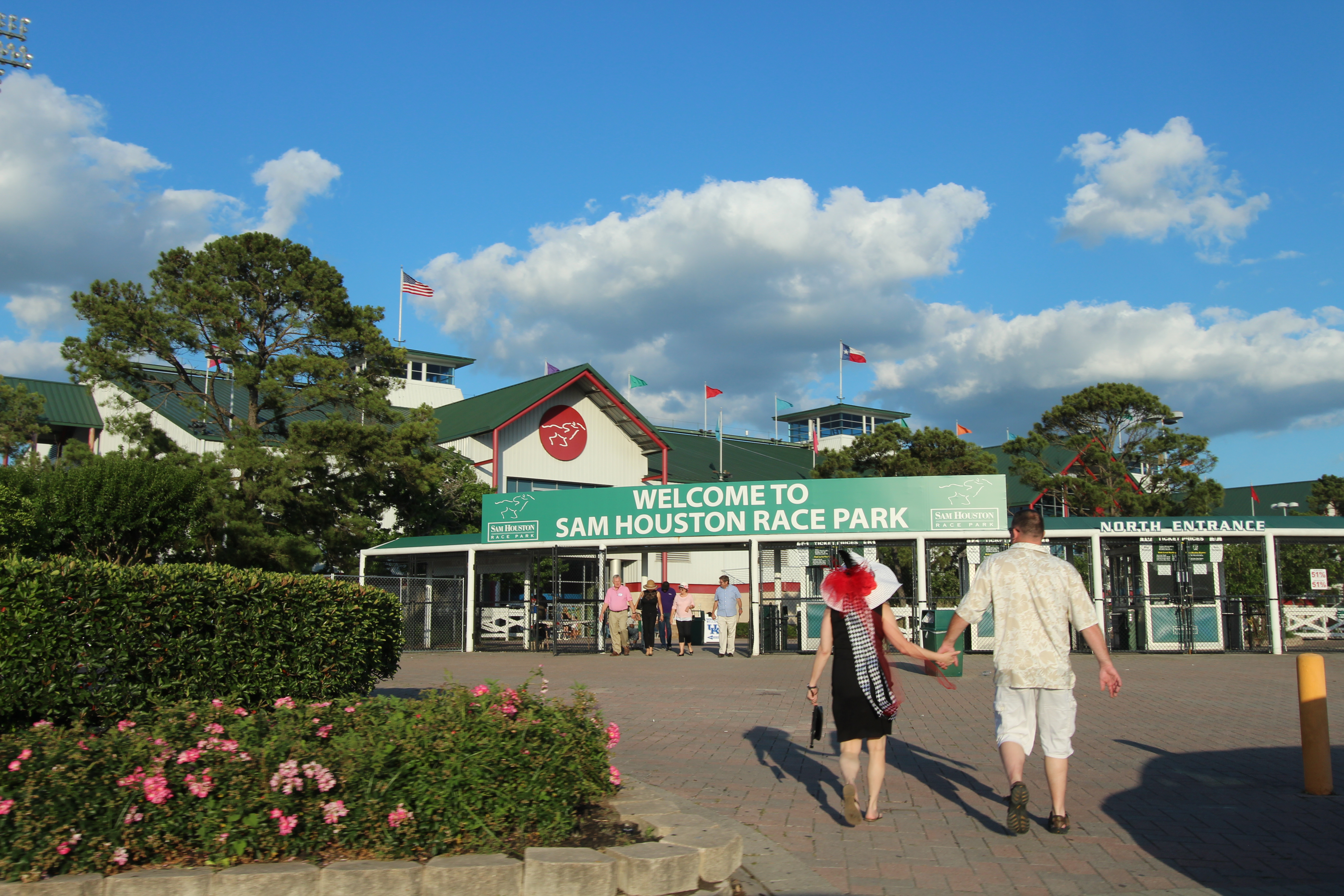
North entrance

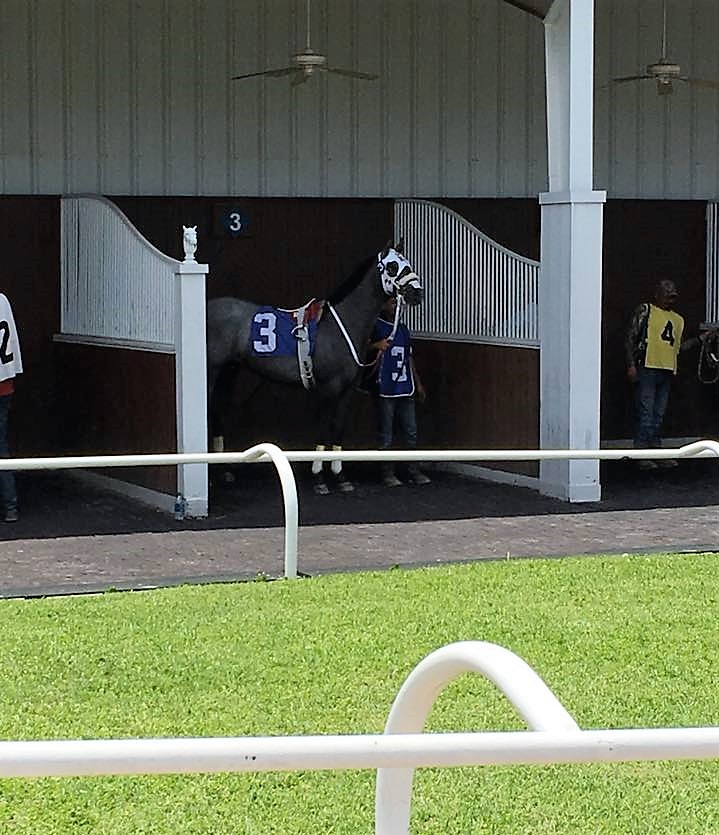
Paddock with horses getting ready for the next race

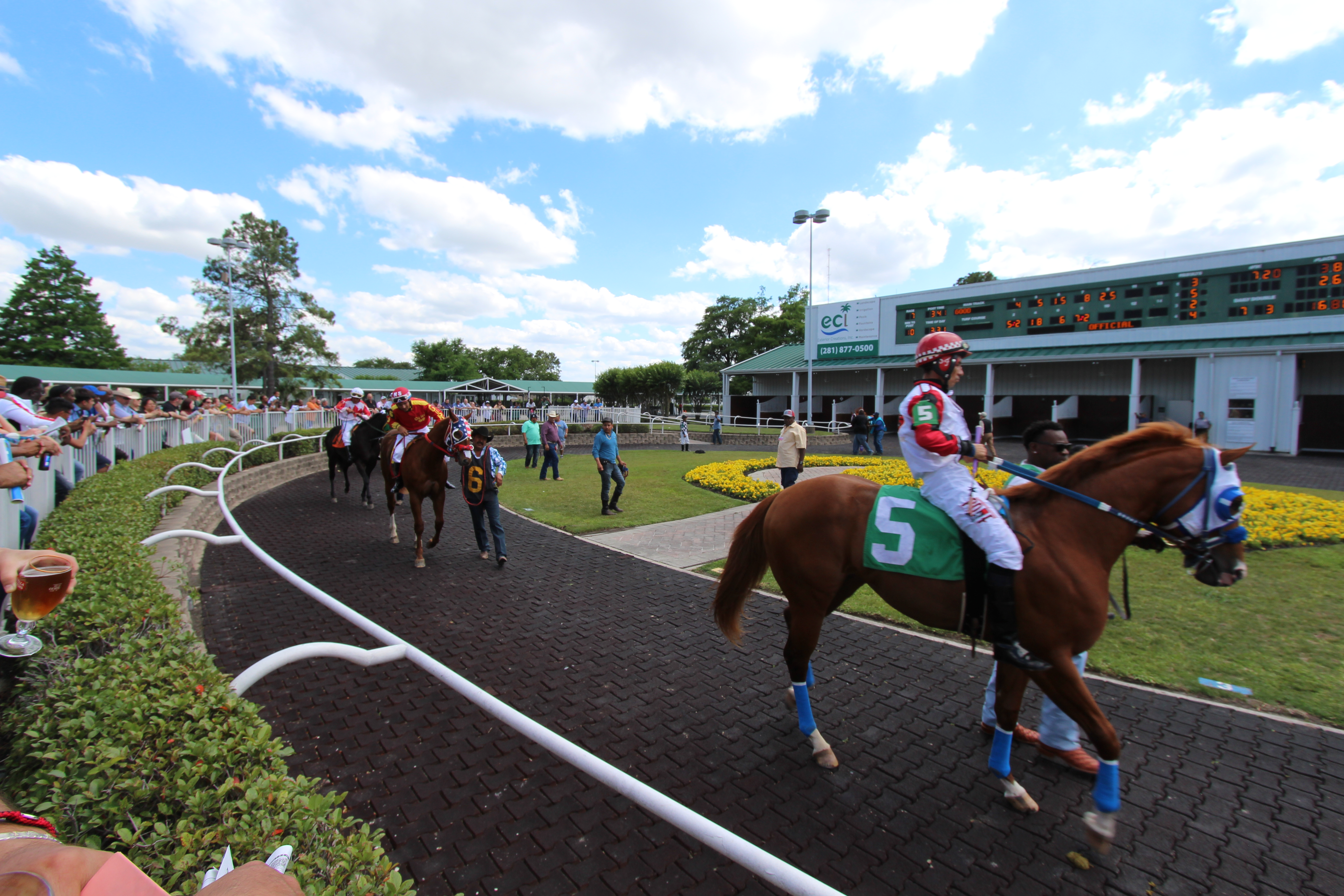
Horses parading in the paddock

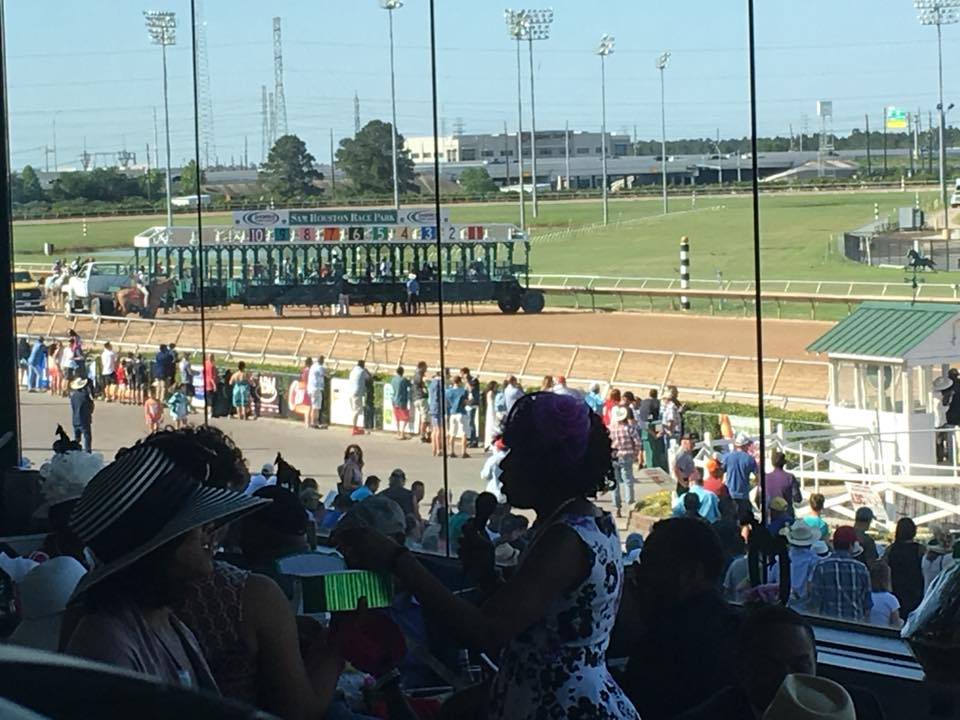
Starting Gate

== See also ==
- List of events in Houston
- Thoroughbred horse racing
- American Quarter Horse
- Thoroughbred
- Horse racing
