= Lone Star State Jam =

The Lone Star Jam is an annual country music festival held in Austin, Texas. The event is produced by 415 Productions, an Austin-based company that coordinates and promotes many events in central Texas. Bud Light is the presenting sponsor each year.

== History ==
=== 2024 ===
The 2024 Lone Star Jam will be held at Round Rock Amp on Saturday, May 25, and Sunday, May 26, in Round Rock, TX. The lineup of performing artists is as follows:

Saturday, May 25:

Lee Brice, Eli Young Band, Kevin Fowler, Mike Ryan, Kat Hasty, Huser Brothers, Tom O'Connor, and Braedon Barnhill

Sunday, May 26:

Robert Earl Keen, Casey Donahew, Roger Creager, Braxton Keith, Django Walker, Adam Hood, Jade Marie Patek, and Gunnar Latham

=== 2023 ===
The 2023 Lone Star Jam was held on Saturday, May 27, and Sunday, May 28, at Round Rock Amp in Round Rock, Texas. The lineup of performing artists included:

Saturday, May 27:

Pat Green, Stoney LaRue, Charlie Robison, Jon Wolfe, Triston Marez, Bri Bagwell, Wynn Williams, and The Droptines

Sunday, May 28:

Randy Rogers Band, Josh Abbott Band, Jack Ingram, Kody West, Carson Jeffrey, Cameron Sacky Band, Parker Ryan, and Graycie York

=== 2022 ===
The 2022 Lone Star Jam was held on Saturday, May 28 and Sunday, May 29 at Round Rock Amp in Round Rock, Texas. Performing artists included: Randy Rogers & Wade Bowen, Eli Young Band, Shane Smith & The Saints, Kevin Fowler, Morgan Wade, Reckless Kelly, Roger Creager, Josh Ward, Kody West, Bob Schneider, Kat Hasty, Austin Meade, William Beckmann, Carson Jeffrey, Jacob Stelly, and Slade Coulter.

=== 2021 ===
The 2021 edition was not held due to the COVID-19 pandemic.

=== 2020 ===
The 2020 edition was held online due to the COVID-19 pandemic.

=== 2019 ===
The 2019 Jam was held on Saturday, May 25 and Sunday, May 26. Performing artists included: The Turnpike Troubadours, Josh Abbott Band, Granger Smith, Casey Donahew, Wade Bowen, Stoney LaRue, William Clark Green, Jon Wolfe, Jason Boland & The Stragglers, Cody Canada & The Departed, Mike Ryan and many more.

=== 2018 ===
The 2018 Jam was held on Saturday, May 26 and Sunday, May 27. Performing artists included: Gary Allan, Randy Rogers Band, Casey Donahew, Kevin Fowler, Reckless Kelly, Roger Creager, Stoney LaRue, William Clark Green, Flatland Cavalry, Roger Creager, Parker McCollum and many more.

=== 2017 ===
The 2017 Jam was held on Saturday, May 27 and Sunday, May 28. Performing artists included: Saturday May 27:

- Pat Green
- Aaron Watson
- Stoney LaRue
- William Clark Green
- Cory Morrow
- Cody Canada & The Departed
- Parker McCollum
- Koe Wetzel
- Curtis Grimes
- Randall King

Sunday May 28:

- Josh Abbott Band
- Casey Donahew
- Wade Bowen
- Roger Creager
- Charlie Robison
- Mike Ryan
- Flatland Cavalry
- Rob Baird
- Dalton Domino
- Kaitlin Butts

=== 2016 ===
The 2016 Jam was held on Saturday, May 7 and Sunday, May 8. Performing artists included: Saturday May 7:

- Randy Rogers Band
- Casey Donahew Band
- Kevin Fowler
- Charlie Robison
- William Clark Green
- Jon Wolfe
- The Damn Quails
- Dalton Domino
- Bart Crow
- John Baumann

Sunday May 8:

- Turnpike Troubadours
- Cody Johnson
- Stoney LaRue
- The Cadillac Three
- Kyle Park
- Cody Canada & The Departed
- Mike Ryan
- Shane Smith & The Saints
- Zane Williams
- Bri Bagwell

=== 2015 ===
The 2015 Jam was held on Saturday, May 2 and Sunday, May 3 at The LBJ Library Lawn on campus at The University Of Texas At Austin. Performing artists included: Saturday May 2:

- Eli Young Band
- Wade Bowen
- Jack Ingram
- Cory Morrow
- William Clark Green
- Charlie Robison
- Sam Riggs
- Shane Smith & The Saints
- Thieving Birds
- Midnight River Choir

Sunday May 3:

- Turnpike Troubadours
- Kevin Fowler
- Randy Rogers Band
- Whiskey Myers
- Jason Boland & The Stragglers
- Curtis Grimes
- JB & The Moonshine
- Mike Ryan
- The Crooks
- Cody Bryan Band

=== 2014 ===
The 2014 Jam was held on Saturday, May 3 and Sunday, May 4 at The LBJ Library Lawn on campus at The University Of Texas At Austin. Performing artists included: Saturday May 4:

- Kevin Fowler
- Stoney Larue
- Wade Bowen
- Jack Ingram
- Roger Creager
- Will Hoge
- Cody Canada & The Departed
- Bart Crow
- Josh Grider
- Sam Riggs & The Night People

Sunday May 5:

- Randy Rogers Band
- Casey Donahew Band
- Reckless Kelly
- Aaron Watson
- Cory Morrow
- Kyle Park
- Charlie Robison
- Sean McConnell
- American Aquarium
- The Damn Quails

=== 2013 ===
The 2013 Jam was held on Saturday, May 4 and Sunday, May 5 at The LBJ Library Lawn on campus at The University Of Texas At Austin. Performing artists included: Saturday May 4:

- Josh Abbott Band
- Stoney Larue
- Reckless Kelly
- Aaron Watson
- Roger Creager
- Charlie Robison
- Whiskey Myers
- Granger Smith
- Curtis Grimes
- William Clark Green

Sunday May 5:

- Kevin Fowler
- Jack Ingram
- Cory Morrow
- Bob Schneider
- Kyle Park
- Dirty River Boys
- Cody Johnson Band
- The Cadillac Three
- The Rankin Twins
- Randy Rogers Band

=== 2012 ===
The 2012 Lone Star Jam was held May 5, 2012 at The LBJ Library Lawn on campus at The University of Texas at Austin. Performing artists included:

- Randy Rogers Band
- Josh Abbott Band
- Stoney Larue
- Jason Boland & the Stragglers
- Charlie Robison
- Cody Canada & The Departed
- Whiskey Myers
- Brandon Rhyder
- Micky & The Motorcars
- No Justice

=== 2011 ===
The 2011 Lone Star Jam was held at Waterloo Park on Saturday April 16, 2011. Performing artists included:

- Eli Young Band
- Kevin Fowler
- Casey Donahew Band
- Josh Abbott Band
- Roger Creager
- Brandon Rhyder
- Kyle Park
- Turnpike Troubadours
- Curtis Grimes

=== 2010 ===
The 2010 Lone Star State Jam was held at Waterloo Park on Saturday, April 24, 2010. Artists that performed included:

- Eli Young Band
- Stoney Larue & The Arsenals
- Casey Donahew Band
- Jason Boland & the Stragglers
- Jack Ingram
- Aaron Watson
- Micky & The Motorcars
- Fred Andrews and Honeybrowne
- Kristen Kelly & The Modern Day Drifters

=== 2009 ===
The 2009 Lone Star State Jam was held on Saturday, April 25, 2009 at Waterloo Park in downtown Austin. Artists that performed at the event include:

- Randy Rogers Band
- Eli Young Band
- Aaron Watson
- Cory Morrow
- Wade Bowen
- Roger Creager
- Bleu Edmondson
- Ryan James
- Django Walker

=== 2008 ===
The first Lone Star State Jam was held on Saturday, April 26, 2008 at Waterloo Park. Attendance at the event was over 6,000. Artists that performed in 2008 included:

- Kevin Fowler
- Cross Canadian Ragweed
- Eli Young Band
- Cory Morrow
- Wade Bowen
- Roger Creager
- Adam Hood
- Bleu Edmondson
- Ryan James
- Bart Crow
