= Will Knaak =

American guitarist

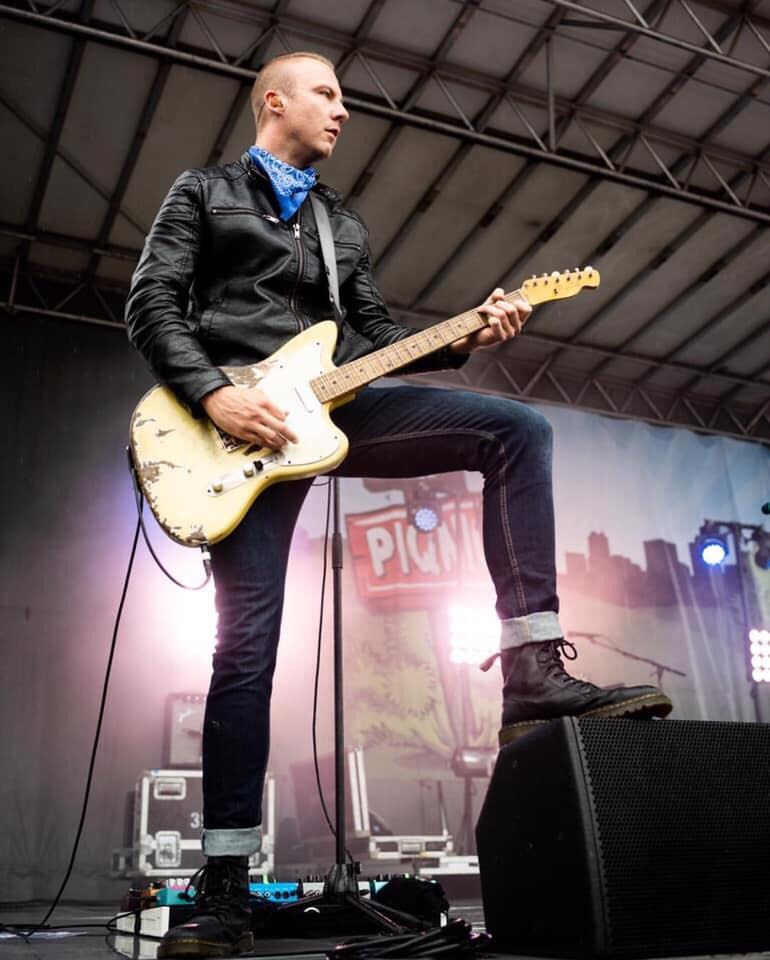
- Knaak on stage in 2019

Background information
- Born: September 23, 1984 (age 41); Austin, Texas, U.S.
- Genres: Alternative rock; country; blues
- Occupations: guitarist; singer; songwriter; musician
- Instruments: Vocals; guitar; lap steel; Pedal steel guitar; dobro; banjo; keyboards
- Years active: 1996–current
- Labels: Loungeside Records; WK; Big Duke Six; AcidBuffalo; Stepchild Records; Brando Records
- Member of: Blue October
- Formerly of: Wade Bowen, Blue October, Parker McCollum Band
- Website: willknaak.com

William Carter Knaak (born September 23, 1984, Austin, Texas) is an American guitarist and singer-songwriter who has released his own albums as a solo artist and frontman, and has performed as a sideman in several bands, notably as lead guitarist in the alternative rock band Blue October and on guitar and Pedal steel guitar with country superstar Parker McCollum.

== Early life and musical start ==
Knaak was born and raised in Austin, Texas. His father played piano and fronted his own band Mad Knaak and the Revolution, and also briefly played keyboard in The 13th Floor Elevators. His grandmother played violin, and his uncle was a guitar player. When Knaak was eleven, his mother died in a house fire.

Following his mother's death, Will and his father moved into an apartment in a different part of town. Unfamiliar with the neighborhood and unable to play with his friends from his previous home, Knaak isolated himself in his room and played guitar for several hours every day, learning songs by his favorite bands such as Tripping Daisy, Nirvana, Soundgarden, and the Offspring. Knaak's uncle introduced him to the music of Chuck Berry’s rock ‘n’ roll and country greats such as Waylon Jennings, Merle Haggard, and Willie Nelson, contributing to Knaak's blend of alternative rock and country guitar playing style.

Knaak and his dad would often dine at the Broken Spoke restaurant in Austin, which hosted live music acts. After a performance at the Spoke, performer Guitar Lynn taught Knaak the blues scale on guitar and suggested he could use this knowledge to solo with blues bands on nearly any song. As a twelve-year-old, Knaak soon found himself sitting in at gigs with local players such as Charlie and Will Sexton, Doug Sahm, and Paul Ray of the Cobras.

Aged 13, Knaak joined the kid band Redheaded Stepchild along with future Snarky Puppy guitarist Chris McQueen and other classmates. The group played western swing covers, and even wrote some original songs, releasing the album Deep, Wide, & Forever in 1998. Knaak graduated from Natural Ear Music School in Austin where his teachers included the legendary fiddler Alvin Crow and Texas Music Hall of Famer Johnny X Reed who both promptly invited him to play as sideman at their gigs, and immersed him into the deep history of the Austin blues scene in addition to adding the influences of 50s R&B and surf rock to Knaak's playing.

After a year of performing weekly concerts with Reed's band The Nortons, and Crow's group The Pleasant Valley Boys, at age sixteen Knaak was fronting his own band, Knaak Attack, with bassist Silas Parker and drummer Vincent Ambrosone. Record producer David Dickinson caught one of their shows and offered to produce an album for the group, which they sold on CD-Rs at their concerts throughout their formative years.

When Knaak was fifteen, the mayor of Austin, Kirk Watson, declared May 24, 2000 as Will Knaak Day, which culminated in Will headlining an outdoor concert in front of five thousand fans at Auditorium Shores. He credits this as the day when he fully committed himself to pursuing a career in music and never looked back.

== Music career ==
Knaak recorded his first solo album The Only Open Road at Shine Studios in Dripping Springs, Texas with producer Jeff Plankenhorn, longtime guitarist in Bob Schneider’s band. The set was mixed and engineered by Justin Douglas and released on Loungeside Records in February 2016. Knaak's band for the album included drummer Brannen Temple and bassist Yoggie Musgrove. Later in 2016 Knaak teamed up with a different group of players to record the EP Will Knaak & the Voodoo Exorcists which showcased a hard-edged sound heavily influenced by 90s grunge, The Joshua Tree era U2, Stevie Ray Vaughan, Lenny Kravitz, and Jimi Hendrix. Working with Lance Harvill as producer, the band consisted of Chris Gilbreath on rhythm guitar, Keith Long on bass, and Michael Ferguson on drums. In December 2016 Knaak's former teenage band The Knaak Attack played a reunion show and enjoyed the experience so much that they went into the studio and recorded an album, independently releasing it in May 2017. The group played a series of concerts that summer to promote the album.

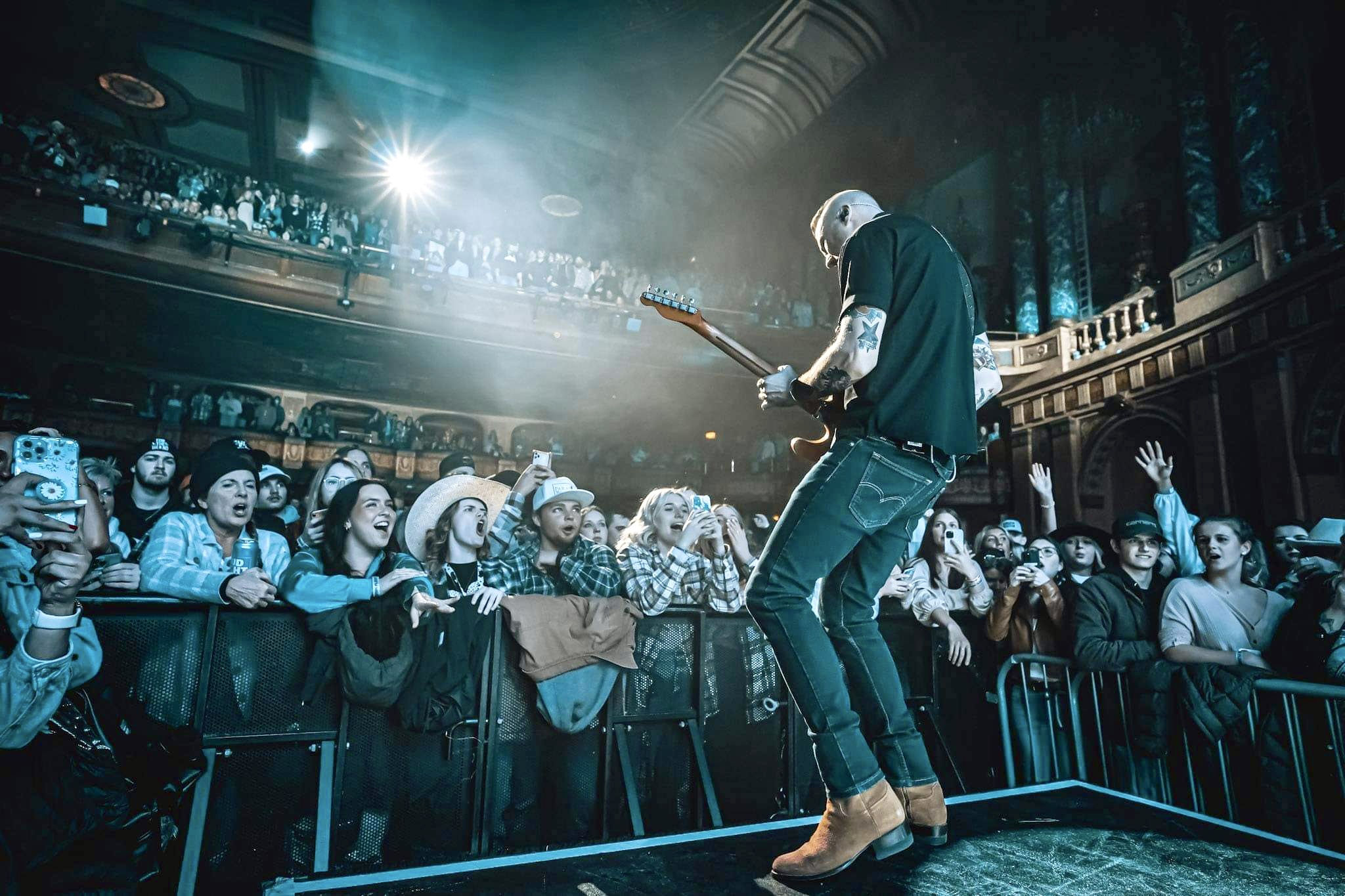
Knaak on stage with Parker McCollum's band at The Fillmore Detroit in 2023.

In addition to his solo work, Knaak has been an in-demand sideman and session player in the Austin scene for a diverse array of artists. He played national tours with acts such as Kacy Crowley, Angela Peterson, Johnny Solinger of Skid Row, The Squires, Parker McCollum, and Wade Bowen and Randy Rogers.

Knaak joined Bowen's band for the tour in support of Bowen's 2014 self-titled album, which included an appearance on Late Night with Conan O'Brien. Knaak then played banjo and guitar on Bowen and Rogers' 2015 collaborative album Hold My Beer Vol. 1, which peaked at number 4 on the Billboard Country albums chart, and number 3 on Billboard's Independent Albums Chart. He played on the album's supporting tour "Hold My Beer and Watch This!" and continued as a member of Bowen's band until 2018. Inspired by the birth of his daughter, and unable to tour during the COVID-19 pandemic, Knaak recorded a solo album Live in Lockdown Vol. 1 which he released via Bandcamp on June 23, 2020. On April 29, 2022 Knaak self-released a jazz-influenced minimalist instrumental album entitled Lonely Lo-Fi. In November 2022 Knaak launched a kickstarter campaign for his next solo album Dying Day which he described as a "gritty, soulful, bluesy, and roots-based". The campaign raised over $20,000, double the initial goal. Knaak's goal was to record the album by June 2023 and release it in 2024. As of August 2023, the recording sessions are complete, and the album will be mixed by Blue October's recording engineer Eric Holtz in mid 2023, in preparation for a 2024 release.

In June–July 2022, Knaak toured as a sideman in Parker McCollum's band, which included several dates opening for Thomas Rhett. Following the tour, he accepted an offer to be full-time guitarist in McCollum's band starting in December 2022. Knaak toured extensively as a member of McCollum's backing band for the next several years. On March 30, 2023, the band performed their song "Handle on You" on The Tonight Show Starring Jimmy Fallon.

In 2026 Knaak toured as a member of Ty Myers' backing band.

== Blue October and related projects ==
Through his extensive session work in Austin, Knaak befriended local producer and studio owner Matt Noveskey. When Noveskey's band Blue October found themselves in need of a guitarist in February 2018, Knaak jumped at the opportunity. His first studio work with the band was on the song "King" for their ninth studio album I Hope You're Happy which reached number 28 on the Billboard 200 and number 3 on the Billboard Alternative Albums chart. He also appeared in the music video for the single "Daylight". He toured North America and Europe for Blue October's I Hope You’re Happy tour in 2018–2019, and his first album with the group, Live From Manchester was released in November 2019. In 2020 Knaak played lead guitar on Blue October's tenth album This is What I Live For and received co-writing credit for the song "Stay with Me". In a 2020 interview, Blue October frontman Justin Furstenfeld said Knaak is probably the most talented guitarist Blue October has ever had, calling him a "true professional guitarist". Along with Noveskey and Blue October's drum technician Charley Seiss, Knaak is also a member of the Ryan Delahoussaye-fronted side project The Meeting Place, which played their first shows in August 2019. He also contributed guitar to Matt Noveskey's side project Icarus Bell, co-writing the band's debut single "Aces". During the summer of 2022 Knaak toured with Blue October, opening for the Goo Goo Dolls on a three month run which saw the band playing premier amphitheaters across North America. Knaak contributed guitar to part 1 of Blue October's double album Spinning the Truth Around, and co-wrote the music for two songs, "How Can You Love Me If You Don't Even Like Me?", and "The Kitchen Drawer". Knaak played guitar on the first leg of the album's supporting tour in late 2022. Knaak's final concert with Blue October was December 17, 2022, in San Antonio, Texas. On August 8, 2024 at a concert in New Braunfels, Texas, Will joined Blue October on stage for the first time in nearly two years. In October 2025 Knaak rejoined Blue October to play guitar on their "We Didn't Die Young" tour. In the summer of 2026 Knaak toured in Europe with Blue October both as a member of the band and as the opening act.

== Discography ==
Year	Artist	Title
1998	RedHeaded Stepchild	Deep, Wide, & Forever
2004	Alvin Crow	White Trash Opera
2006	Melissa Sellers	Deep South Austin
2009	The Statesboro Revue	A Different Kind of Light
2009	Wes Hayden	Full Circle
2010	Jon Wolfe	It All Happened in a Honky Tonk
2015	Randy Rogers and Wade Bowen	Hold My Beer Vol. 1
2015	Royal Southern Brotherhood	Don't Look Back: The Muscle Shoals Sessions
2015	Pauline Reese	Just Getting Started
2016	Will Knaak	The Only Open Road
2016	Will Knaak & the Voodoo Exorcists	Will Knaak & the Voodoo Exorcists
2017	Knaak Attack	Knaak Attack
2018	Blue October	I Hope You're Happy
2019	Blue October	King
2019	Jake Lloyd	MoonLit Mornings
2019	Blue October	Live From Manchester
2020	Will Knaak	Live in Lockdown Vol. 1
2020	Blue October	This Is What I Live For
2020	Lia Catallo	In My Fantasies
2022	Will Knaak	Lonely Lofi
2022	Blue October	Spinning the Truth Around (Part I)
2022	Durawa	One Human Race
2025	Will Knaak	Dying Day
