= If We Ever Make It Home =

Studio album by Wade Bowen
- Released: September 30, 2008
- Genres: Red dirt, Texas country
- Label: Sustain Records
- Producer: J.R. Rodriguez

Wade Bowen chronology
Lost Hotel (2006)	If We Ever Make It Home (2008)	Live at Billy Bob's Texas (2010)

If We Ever Make It Home is Wade Bowen's third studio album. It was released in the fall of 2008. The album captures the emotion Bowen's wife's battle with post-partum depression. The song "Daddy and the Devil" features the vocals of singer/songwriter Chris Knight. The album's second single, "Trouble," is the second of Bowen's songs to have a music video, which was directed by Evan Kaufmann.

== Track listing ==
1. "You Had Me at My Best" (Wade Bowen, Jedd Hughes) – 4:17
2. "If We Ever Make It Home" (Bowen, Jim Beavers) – 4:08
3. "Turn on the Lights" (Bowen, Stephony Smith) – 3:51
4. "Ghost in This Town" (Bowen, Michael Cox) – 3:56
5. "Why Makes Perfect Sense" (Bowen, Randy Rogers) – 5:15
6. "Trouble" (Bowen, Clint Ingersoll) – 4:01
7. "Nobody's Fool" (Bowen, Rogers) – 3:36
8. "Into the Arms of You" (Sean McConnell) – 4:18
9. "From Bad to Good" (Bowen, Radney Foster) – 4:01
10. "Missing You" (Matt Powell) – 3:38
11. "Daddy and the Devil" (ft. Chris Knight) (Chuck Cannon, Chuck Jones, Tom Bukovac) – 3:44
12. "Somewhere Beautiful" (McConnell) – 5:04

== Personnel ==
- Drums – Shawn Fitcher
- Bass guitar – David Santos
- Electric guitar – David Grissom, Jedd Hughes, Tom Bukovac, Kenny Greenberg, Greg V.
- Acoustic guitar – Ilya Toshinsky, Jedd Hughes, Tom Bukovac, Greg V.
- Steel guitar, lap steel guitar – Dan Dugmore
- Mandolin – Aubrey Haynie
- Percussion – Eric Darken
- Keyboards – Charlie Judge, Tim Lauer, J.R. Rodriguez
- Piano, accordion, B3 organ – Charlie Judge
- Pump organ – Tim Lauer
- Lead vocals – Wade Bowen
- Background vocals – Jedd Hughes, Emily Francis, Sonya Isaacs, Ashley Monroe, Melodie Crittenden, Wes Hightower, Russell Terrell, J.R. Rodriguez
- Guest vocals – Chris Knight on "Daddy and the Devil"

== Chart performance ==
Chart (2008)	Peak position
U.S. Billboard Top Country Albums	29
U.S. Billboard 200	176
U.S. Billboard Top Heatseekers	2
