= Rollercoaster (Randy Rogers Band album) =

Studio album by Randy Rogers Band
- Released: August 24, 2004
- Genre: Country, Texas country
- Label: Smith Music Group
- Producer: Radney Foster

Randy Rogers Band chronology
Like It Used to Be (2004)	Rollercoaster (2004)	Live at Billy Bob's Texas (2005)

Professional ratings
Review scores
Source	Rating
Allmusic	link

Rollercoaster is the second album released by the Randy Rogers Band, an American country music group. The first single, "Tonight's Not The Night", peaked at #43 on the Billboard Hot Country Songs charts.

"This Time Around" was written with Cross Canadian Ragweed's lead singer, Cody Canada. It was later released as a single from their 2005 album Garage. Canada also wrote "Again".

== Track listing ==
1. "Down & Out" (Randy Rogers) – 4:03
2. "Somebody Take Me Home" (Radney Foster, Rogers) – 3:31
3. "This Time Around" (Cody Canada, Rogers) – 4:33
4. "Love Must Follow You Around" (Foster, Rogers) – 4:39
5. "Lay It All on You" (Wade Bowen, Rogers) – 3:45
6. "Tonight's Not The Night (For Goodbye)" (Foster, Rogers) – 4:50
7. "Again" (Canada, Rogers) – 3:21
8. "Can't Slow Down" (Rogers) – 4:41
9. "They Call It the Hill Country" (Kent Finlay) – 5:23
10. "Ten Miles Deep" (Jon Richardson) – 3:19
11. "I Miss You With Me (Bonus Track – "Like It Used to Be") (Rogers) – 9:18
