= Carter Blackburn =

American sportscaster

- Born: March 30, 1979 (age 47); Dallas, Texas
- Education: Syracuse University
- Years active: 2001–present
- Sports commentary career
- Genre: Play-by-play
- Sports: College football, College basketball
- Employer: CBS Sports

Carter Blackburn (born March 30, 1979) is an American sportscaster. He currently works for CBS Sports after leaving ESPN in 2014.

== Early life and education ==
Blackburn was born in Dallas, Texas, and grew up in Kerrville, in the Texas Hill Country near San Antonio. Blackburn began his broadcasting career at KERV/KRVL radio during his sophomore year at Tivy High School. By his junior year in high school, he was sports director for the radio station, doing morning drive-time reports on area high school sports and Texas college and pro teams as well as providing play-by-play for radio and TV for football, basketball, softball, and baseball.

He then graduated from the S.I. Newhouse School of Public Communications of Syracuse University in 2001 with a degree in broadcast journalism and political science. At Syracuse, he served as play-by-play announcer for football, basketball and lacrosse broadcasts on WAER-FM.

== Professional career ==
He worked for International Sports Properties (ISP) in Winston-Salem, North Carolina, and Fox Sports Net South from 2001 to 2003; among his assignments were games in what became the NBA Development League. He joined CBS Sports (then known as CSTV) in 2003 when the channel launched. Blackburn made his national broadcast television debut on CBS Sports with a Big Ten women's basketball game between Penn State and Michigan State in January, 2008. He later called two 2008 NCAA Division I men's basketball tournament games, working afternoon session games at the Honda Center in Anaheim, California. He reprised that role in 2009 & 2016.

In September 2009 he began broadcasting for ESPN and ESPNU. He provided play-by-play for TV broadcasts of NCAA football, men's and women's basketball, baseball, softball, and lacrosse. In 2011, Blackburn broadcast the 2008 Reebok Grand Prix where Usain Bolt set a new world record in the 100 meters with a time of 9.71. In 2011 Blackburn provided play-by-play for the World Series of Softball tournament in Oklahoma City, OK. In 2012, he replaced Joe Tessitore for the Friday Night Football package for ESPN and ESPN2. He also called Little League Baseball games for ESPN.

In August 2014, Blackburn was named by CBS as its lead play-by-play announcer for its sports network. He also called college basketball, football, and baseball games. On December 27, 2014 Blackburn filled in for Verne Lundquist during the 2014 Sun Bowl. Blackburn was a part of the CBS Sports team doing feature group coverage for the 2015 Masters golf tournament. He also calls NFL games for CBS on occasion, partnering with Chris Simms for 2015 and 2016.

By age thirty-one, Blackburn had called the NFL on Fox, the NCAA basketball tournament on CBS, and college football on ABC. In 2008, at 26, Blackburn was the second-youngest announcer of an NCAA Tournament game, at least in CBS's run as the telecaster. Jim Nantz was the only one younger (26 years old in 1985).

== Notable calls ==
Blackburn called then-Penn State coach Joe Paterno’s record setting 409th win for ABC, Paterno’s last game as coach of the Nittany Lions.

- March 18, 2016: Blackburn was the play-by-play announcer for Turner Sports's coverage of the NCAA Division I men's basketball tournament's first round match–up between the Northern Iowa Panthers and the Texas Longhorns, where Panthers guard Paul Jesperson hit a half court shot at the buzzer to upset the Longhorns 75–72 just seconds after Isaiah Taylor hit a running floater to tie the game at 72.
- August 24, 2019: Blackburn was the play-by-play announcer for CBS Sports college football coverage of the Week 0 match–up between the Arizona Wildcats and Hawaii Rainbow Warriors, where Khalil Tate was tackled by Hawaii defensive lineman Manly Williams and defensive back Kalen Hicks at the one yard line as time expired in an attempt to bring the game within one point pending the extra point.

== Personal life ==
Blackburn lives in Austin, Texas.
