= KTKO =

KTKO may refer to:

- KTKO (FM), a radio station (105.7 FM) licensed to serve Beeville, Texas, United States
- KXMP-LD, a low-power television station (channel 8) licensed to serve Harrison, Arkansas, United States, which held the call sign KTKO-LP from 2003 to 2020
