= The Version of Me You Get =

2026 studio album by Wade Bowen

Studio album by Wade Bowen
- Released: September 25, 2026
- Recorded: 2020
- Studio: Silent Desert Studio
- Genre: Texas country
- Length: 36:04
- Label: Bowen Sounds

Wade Bowen chronology
Somewhere Between the Secret and the Truth (2022)	The Version of Me You Get (2026)

The Version of Me You Get is the eleventh studio album by Texas country singer Wade Bowen. It was released on Bowen Sounds, distributed by Thirty Tigers on September 25, 2026. The album serves as a follow-up to his 2022 album, Somewhere Between the Secret and the Truth.

== Recording ==
The Version of Me You Get was written and recorded in 2020 with Bowen’s longtime collaborator, Sean McConnell, during one of the hardest chapters of Bowen’s life. He had recently lost his nephew, who was also a part of his crew, and was forced to take an unwanted break from performing due to vocal issues. The result was a departure from Bowen's earlier musical style, to a more roots-oriented sound.

== Release ==
Bowen did not release the project until 2026, after revisiting the material with a fresh perspective. In discussing the album, Bowen said that the years between its recording and release influenced how he viewed the songs and their themes.

The album release was preceded by four singles. "Rain" was released as the first single on May 15, 2026, followed by "People Like Us" on June 12. "Turpentine" was released on July 17, followed by "Burned In The Fire" on August 21. "Weight On The Levee", featuring Dan Tyminski, was released as the album's focus track on September 25, 2026, and coincided with the album's release.

== Reception ==
Critics mentioned the emotional qualities of the album's early singles. All Country News called "Rain" one of Bowen's more emotionally vivid releases and said that the song documents themes of pain and survival. Entertainment Focus also said that the song brings that side of his writing to the forefront.

After the album came out, Entertainment Focus said that it is a record about getting older, surviving difficult seasons, accepting the things you cannot change and trying, above all, to leave something worthwhile behind.

== Track listing ==
No.	Title	Length
1	Rain	4:01
2	Burned In The Fire	3:41
3	People Like US	3:40
4	Weight On The Levee	4:21
5	Turpentine	3:05
6	Better Left Alone	3:08
7	One More One Last Time	4:33
8	The Garden	3:34
9	Hard World	3:00
10	The Version Of Me You Get	4:00
Total		36:04

== Personnel ==
=== Musicians ===
- Wade Bowen – vocals
- Sean McConnell – drums, bass, acoustic guitar, electric guitar, percussion, piano, harmonies
- Ben Alleman – organ, piano, Rhodes
- Smith Curry – pedal steel
- Dan Tyminski – harmonies, guest vocals
- Adam Hood, Drew Kennedy, Max Stalling, Heather Stalling – group vocals

=== Technical personnel ===
- Sean McConnell – producer, recording (Silent Desert Studio, Nolensville, Tennessee)
- Justin Tocket – mixing (Dockside Studio, Maurice, Louisiana)
- Andrew Mendelson – mastering (Georgetown Masters, Nashville, Tennessee)

=== Additional personnel ===
- Shauna Dodds / Backstage Design Studio – art direction and design
- 7S MGMT – management
  - Zach Fischel, David Bason, Chris Thomas, Ellie Tomasso – management
