= Hold My Beer =

Hold My Beer may refer to:

- Hold My Beer Vol. 1, a 2015 album by Randy Rogers and Wade Bowen
- "Hold My Beer" (Aaron Pritchett song), 2006 from the album Big Wheel
- "Hold My Beer", a song on Trace Adkins' 2010 album Cowboy's Back in Town'
- "Hold My Beer", an unreleased song by Beyoncé
