= KERV =

Radio station in Kerrville, Texas

- Kerrville, Texas; United States
- Broadcast area: Kerrville-Fredericksburg, Texas
- Frequency: 1230 kHz
- Branding: 107.7 Mike FM

Programming
- Format: Adult hits

Ownership
- Owner: Jam Broadcasting, LLC
- Sister stations: KAXA, KRVL, KZAH

History
- First air date: 1982

Technical information
- Licensing authority: FCC
- Facility ID: 25378
- Class: C
- Power: 990 watts unlimited
- Transmitter coordinates: 30°4′14″N 99°11′7″W
- Translator: 107.7 K299CA (Kerrville)

Links
- Public license information: Public file; LMS
- Website: jambroadcasting.com/radio/kerv/

KERV (1230 AM) is a radio station licensed to Kerrville, Texas, United States, and serving the Kerrville-Fredericksburg area. The station is currently owned by Jam Broadcasting, LLC.

== History ==
Previous logo.

KERV-AM first began broadcasting in 1982, serving the Hill Country region of Texas. The station has historically operated from facilities located at 301 Junction Highway in Kerrville. Currently owned by Jam Broadcasting, LLC, the station features an Adult hits format. Its programming is also simulcast on an FM translator, branding the service as "107.7 Mike FM" to reach a wider audience in the Kerrville-Fredericksburg area.

KERV-AM operates on a frequency of 1230 kHz and is classified as a Class C AM station. Its technical parameters include an unlimited power output of 1,000 watts (1 kW), utilizing a non-directional antenna system.

The station serves Kerr County, a region with a diverse economic base including healthcare, tourism, and agriculture. In July 2025, the station's coverage area was severely impacted by historic flash flooding of the Guadalupe River, which caused significant loss of life and property damage throughout Kerrville. During the recovery efforts, local media and businesses collaborated to support the displaced residents and volunteers.

During the initial hours of the crisis, Kerr County’s $7 million emergency radio network failed to provide reliable coverage, and many residents did not receive mobile "CodeRED" alerts until hours after the flooding began. KERV and other local radio groups filled this gap by providing live reporting and real-time flood risk updates for residents in areas with compromised cellular service.

== Translators ==
KERV broadcasts on the following translator:

Broadcast translator for KERV
Call sign	Frequency	City of license	FID	ERP (W)	Class	FCC info
K299CA	107.7 FM	Kerrville, Texas	203201	250	D	LMS
