= Randy Rogers Band (album) =

Studio album by Randy Rogers Band
- Released: September 23, 2008
- Genres: Country, Texas country
- Length: 47:37
- Label: Mercury Nashville
- Producer: Radney Foster

Randy Rogers Band chronology
Just a Matter of Time (2006)	Randy Rogers Band (2008)	Burning the Day (2010)

Professional ratings
Review scores
Source	Rating
About.com	4.5/5 stars
AllMusic	2.5/5 stars

Randy Rogers Band is the sixth album released by the Randy Rogers Band, an American country music group. This is their second album on a major label. "In My Arms Instead" was the first single released from the album; it entered the Billboard Hot Country Songs chart at #58.

== Track listing ==
1. "Wicked Ways" (Jon Richardson) - 4:20
2. "Better Than I Ought to Be" (Gary Nicholson, Randy Rogers) - 2:51
3. "Lonely Too Long" (George Ducas, Rogers) - 3:19
4. "One Woman" (Rogers, Stephony Smith) - 4:05
5. "Never Be That High" (Rogers, Smith) - 3:42
6. "Didn't Know You Could" (Micky Braun, Rogers) - 3:58
7. "In My Arms Instead" (Sean McConnell, Rogers) 5:18
8. "When the Circus Leaves Town" (Clint Ingersoll, Jon Richardson, Rogers) - 4:22
9. "Buy Myself a Chance" (McConnell, Rogers) - 3:41
10. "Break Even" (Geoffrey Hill) - 4:58
11. "Let It Go" (Radney Foster, Rogers) - 3:32
12. "This Is Goodbye" (Ingersoll, Heather Morgan) - 3:25

== Personnel ==
Randy Rogers Band

- Brady Black - fiddle, background vocals
- Geoffrey Hill - electric guitar, background vocals
- Les Lawless - drums
- Jon Richardson - bass guitar
- Randy Rogers - acoustic guitar, lead vocals

Additional Musicians

- Jessi Alexander - background vocals
- Eric Borash - dobro, acoustic guitar, baritone guitar, electric guitar, lap steel guitar, mandolin
- Todd Cooper - background vocals
- Clayton E. Corn - Hammond B-3 organ, keyboards, Wurlitzer
- Radney Foster - acoustic guitar, electric guitar
- Craig Krampf - percussion
- Sean McConnell - background vocals
- Jon Randall - background vocals

== Chart performance ==
Chart (2008)	Peak position
U.S. Billboard Top Country Albums	3
U.S. Billboard 200	29
