= KNVR =

KNVR may refer to:

- KNVR (FM), a radio station (102.5 FM) licensed to serve Fallon, Nevada, United States
- KROY (AM), a radio station (1410 AM) licensed to serve San Saba, Texas, United States, which held the call sign KNVR from 2007 to 2018
- KMIL, a radio station (105.1 FM) licensed to serve Cameron, Texas, which held the call sign KNVR from 2004 to 2007
- KZAP (FM), a radio station (96.7 FM) licensed to serve Paradise, California, United States, which held the call sign KNVR from 1977 to 1992
