= Hold My Beer Vol. 1 =

Hold My Beer, Vol. 1

Studio album by Randy Rogers and Wade Bowen
- Released: April 20, 2015
- Genres: Red dirt, Texas country
- Length: 39:17
- Label: Lil' Buddy Toons
- Producer: Lloyd Maines

Randy Rogers chronology
Trouble (2013)	Hold My Beer, Vol. 1 (2015)	Nothing Shines Like Neon (2016)

Wade Bowen chronology
Wade Bowen (2014)	Hold My Beer, Vol. 1 (2015)	Then Sings My Soul: Songs for My Mother (2016)

Professional ratings
Review scores
Source	Rating
AllMusic	4/5 stars

Hold My Beer Vol. 1 is a duet album by Texas country music singers Randy Rogers and Wade Bowen.

== Track listing ==
1. "In the Next Life" (Wade Bowen, Randy Rogers) – 3:42
2. "I Had My Hopes up High" (Joe Ely) – 4:05
3. "'Till It Does" (Bowen, Lee Thomas Miller, Chris Stapleton) – 3:36
4. "Good Luck with That" (Bowen, John Dickson, Rogers) – 3:45
5. "It's Been a Great Afternoon" (Merle Haggard) – 3:53
6. "Standards" (Brady Black, Brian Keane, Rogers) – 3:38
7. "El Dorado" (Bowen, Bruce Robinson) – 5:06
8. "Hangin' out in Bars" (Rogers) – 4:09
9. "Lady Bug" (Sean McConnell, Jason Saenz) – 3:36
10. "Reasons to Quit" (Haggard) – 3:43

== Personnel ==
- Randy Rogers – Lead Vocals, Background Vocals
- Wade Bowen – Lead Vocals, Background Vocals
- Jay Saldana – Drums
- Caleb Jones – Bass guitar
- Will Knaak – Electric guitar, Banjo
- Todd Laningham – Electric guitar, Acoustic Guitar
- Geoffrey Hill – Electric guitar
- Brady Black – Fiddle
- Riley Osbourn – Keyboards
- Micah Vasquez – Bass guitar
- Lloyd Maines – Pedal Steel Guitar, Dobro, Acoustic Guitar, Mandolin

== Chart performance ==
Chart (2015)	Peak position
US Billboard 200	37
US Top Country Albums (Billboard)	4
US Independent Albums (Billboard)	3
