= Sam Houston Futurity =

- Class: Grade II
- Location: Sam Houston Race Park; Houston, Texas, United States
- Inaugurated: 1994
- Race type: Quarter Horse – flat racing
- Website: https://www.shrp.com

Race information
- Distance: 330 yards
- Surface: Dirt
- Track: left-handed
- Qualification: 2YO; Qualify in trial
- Weight: 122 lbs.
- Purse: $400,000 Added

The Sam Houston Futurity is a horse race that has run since the track at Sam Houston Race Park, Houston, Texas, US, was opened in 1994. It remains one of the premier stakes races for two-year-old quarter horses in Texas. The race is currently run in May, during the Quarter Horse half of Sam Houston Race Park racing season.

In 2010 the distance was shortened from 400 yards to 350 yards, and again in 2011 from 350 yards to 330 yards. These changes downgraded the race from a Grade 1 to a Grade 2.

== Records ==
Speed record:

- 330 yrd. - This Is An Eagle (16.54)
- 400 yrd. - Azoom (19.574)

Most wins by a jockey:

- 4 - Rodrigo Vallejo (1996) (2004) (2005) (2011)

Most wins by a trainer:

- 2 - Frank Cavazos (2004) (2009)
- 2 - Angel Sanchez (2015) (2016)

Most wins by an owner:

- NA

== Winners ==
Year	Winner	Jockey	Trainer	Time	Purse	Gr.
2019	Trump My Record	Eddie Sanchez	Arturo Davila III	16.543	$459,700	II
2018	Fm Im a Zatanaz Too	Manuel Gutierrez	Robert Meche	16.823	$425,179	II
2017	This Is An Eagle	Francisco Calderon	Leon Bard	16.540	$483,600	II
2016	Just Call Me Carter	Francisco Calderon	Angel Sanchez	16.786	$540,000	II
2015	Ivan James	Raul Ramirez	Angel Sanchez	16.701	$621,000	II
2014	Kiss My Hocks	Luis Vivanco	Toby Keeton	16.719	$563,950	II
2013	Especially Tres	Ricky Ramirez	Trey Wood	16.823	$452,800	II
2012	Sassmaster	Macedonio Lozano	Rodrigo Aceves	16.860	$487,700	II
2011	Jess Tee Off	Rodrigo Vallejo	Judd Kearl	16.792	$600,000	II
2010	Sixes Liaison	Saul Ramirez Jr.	Bobby Martinez	17.557	$346,700	I
2009	Eye Got The Blues	Juan Vazquez	Frank Cavazos	19.621	$321,900	I
2008	First Down Mr Jess	Gaspar Garcia	C. Gilbreath	19.910	$335,200	I
2007	Check Cathy	Arturo Puga	Robert Touchet	19.818	$341,700	I
2006	Snowy Alibi	Jacky Martain	Janet Van Bebber	20.063	$316,000	I
2005	All American Winner	Rodrigo Vallejo	Alex Villarreal	19.794	$351,900	I
2004	Azoom	Rodrigo Vallejo	Frank Cavazos	19.574	$350,000	I
2003	Jack Zee Quick	Nickey Laws	Ronald Gilmer	20.134	$300,000	I
2002	Shiney Sign	J. Ramirez	Duane Hartsell	19.968	$314,500	I
2001	Shining Sky	Eddie Cox	Beverly McNeely	20.080	$301,400	I
2000	Mr Bar Code	Alvin Brossette	Matt Baker	19.590	$275,200	I
1999	War Colors	Gilbert Ortiz	Steve Van Bebber	20.020	$175,400	I
1998	Lil Boy Cricket	Alvin Brossette	Chuck Jackson	20.280	$167,600	I
1997	Getting Cash	Zeferino Ortega Jr.	Jose Garza	20.010	$219,404	I
1996	Royal Shake Em	Rodrigo Vallejo	James Harris	20.030	$188,850	I
1995	Beduinos Rusty	Anna Landolt	Jesse Yoakum	19.870	$150,900	I
1994	A Touch of Victory	Saul Ramirez Jr.	K. Carden	20.310	$525,523	I
