= Burning the Day =

Studio album by Randy Rogers Band
- Released: August 24, 2010
- Genre: Country
- Length: 39:50
- Label: MCA Nashville
- Producer: Paul Worley

Randy Rogers Band chronology
Randy Rogers Band (2008)	Burning the Day (2010)	Trouble (2013)

Professional ratings
Review scores
Source	Rating
AllMusic	2.5/5 stars

Burning the Day is the seventh studio album by the Randy Rogers Band, an American country music group. It was released on August 24, 2010, via MCA Nashville. Its first single, "Too Late for Goodbye," peaked at number 47 on the Billboard Hot Country Songs chart.

== Track listing ==
No.	Title	Writer(s)	Length
1.	"Interstate"	Sean McConnell, Randy Rogers	4:42
2.	"Damn the Rain"	Radney Foster, Gordie Sampson	3:02
3.	"Too Late for Goodbye"	McConnell, Rogers	3:40
4.	"Missing You Is More Than I Can Do"	Rogers	3:53
5.	"Holding On to Letting Go"	Bruce Robison, Rogers	3:29
6.	"Just Don't Tell Me the Truth"	Dean Dillon, Dale Dodson, Rogers	2:56
7.	"I've Been Looking for You So Long"	McConnell, Rogers	4:12
8.	"Steal You Away"	Jeff Middleton, Mark Mulch, Nick Mulch	3:50
9.	"Starting Over for the Last Time"	Geoffrey Hill, Jon Richardson, Rogers	4:12
10.	"I Met Lonely Tonight"	Rogers	2:52
11.	"Last Last Chance"	Hill, Richardson	3:02

== Personnel ==
Compiled from liner notes.

=== Randy Rogers Band ===
- Brady Black — fiddle, background vocals
- Geoffrey Hill — electric guitar, background vocals
- Les Lawless — drums
- Jon Richardson — bass guitar
- Randy Rogers — lead vocals, acoustic guitar

=== Additional musicians ===
- Eric Borash — electric guitar
- Bruce Bouton — steel guitar
- Shelly Fairchild — background vocals
- Brian Keane — background vocals
- Tim Lauer — piano, Hammond B-3 organ, Wurlitzer electric piano, clavinet
- Shannon Lawson — background vocals
- Paul Worley — acoustic guitar

== Chart performance ==
Chart (2010)	Peak position
U.S. Billboard 200	8
U.S. Billboard Country Albums	2
