= Just a Matter of Time (Randy Rogers Band album) =

Studio album by Randy Rogers Band
- Released: September 12, 2006
- Genre: Country
- Label: Mercury Nashville
- Producer: Radney Foster

Randy Rogers Band chronology
Live at Billy Bob's Texas (2005)	Just a Matter of Time (2006)	Randy Rogers Band (2008)

Just a Matter of Time is the fifth album released by the Randy Rogers Band, an American country music group. Their first album for a major label, it includes two songs which as singles charted on the Billboard Hot Country Songs charts: "Kiss Me in the Dark" at number 43 and "One More Goodbye" at number 53. It was produced by Radney Foster. The former Sons of the Desert lead singer Drew Womack co-wrote the track "If Anyone Asks".

== Track listing ==
1. "Better off Wrong" (Randy Rogers, Radney Foster, Gary Nicholson) – 4:24
2. "Kiss Me In the Dark" (Foster, George Ducas) – 3:48
3. "One More Goodbye" (Rogers, Clint Ingersol) – 4:13
4. "Just a Matter of Time" (Rogers, Stephony Smith) – 3:54
5. "You Could've Left Me" (Rogers, Kent Finlay) – 4:05
6. "You Could Change My Mind" (Rogers, Smith) – 3:44
7. "Before I Believe It's True" (Rogers, Foster) – 4:53
8. "You Start over Your Way" (Rogers, Foster) – 3:15
9. "If Anyone Asks" (Rogers, Drew Womack) – 4:24
10. "You Don't Know Me" (Jon Richardson) – 4:07
11. "If I Told You the Truth" (Rogers, Foster) – 3:57
12. "Whiskey's Got a Hold on Me" (Rogers, Smith) – 4:08

== Chart performance ==
Chart (2006)	Peak position
U.S. Billboard Top Country Albums	8
U.S. Billboard 200	61
