= Max Stalling =

American singer-songwriter (born 1966)

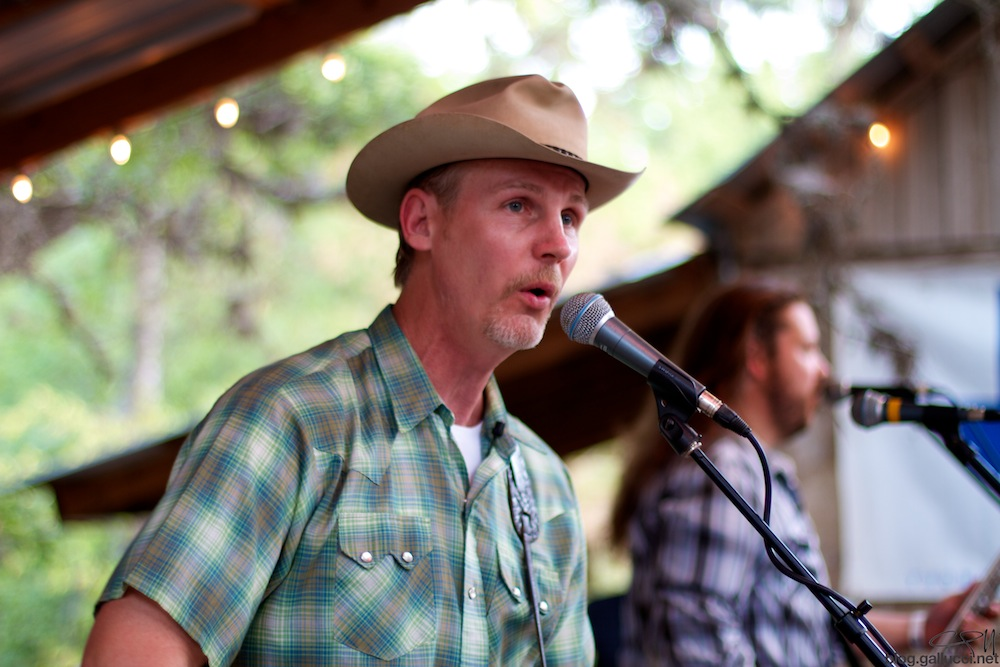
- Max Stalling in Luckenbach, Texas, July 16, 2011.

Background information
- Born: December 27, 1966 (age 59)
- Origin: Uvalde, Texas, United States
- Genres: Texas Country
- Occupation: Singer-songwriter
- Instruments: Vocals rhythm guitar
- Years active: 1997–present
- Label: Blind Nello
- Website: http://www.maxstalling.com

Max Stalling (born December 27, 1966) is an American singer-songwriter who specializes in Texas country music.

== Early life ==
Stalling is from Crystal City. He attended kindergarten through high school in Carrizo Springs. He studied at Texas A&M University, where he earned an undergraduate and a master's degree in Food Science. He was also a member of the Texas A&M University Corps of Cadets, serving as commander of Company A-1 his senior year. It was in graduate school that Stalling first picked up the guitar and began dabbling with songwriting. After college, Stalling moved to Dallas, where he entered the corporate world. He first worked for Campbell-Taggart Baking Company in product development and then for Frito-Lay as a research scientist. Once in Dallas, Stalling discovered the vibrant music scene of North Texas.

== Musical career ==
In Dallas, Stalling started writing songs, recording albums, and developing his musical style. He drew inspiration from artists like Townes Van Zandt, Robert Earl Keen, and Guy Clark. Eventually, Stalling was performing with a full band to back him. His first band consisted of Jeff Howe on drums and percussion, Bryce Clarke on nylon-string guitar, electric guitar, and mandolin, and Jason Steinsultz on stand-up and electric bass as well as singing harmony. As soon as Stalling's music career started taking off, he quit his job with Frito-Lay and started pursuing music full-time. Stalling plays about 150 shows a year and is in the third year of a Budweiser sponsorship. He is a former member of the Board of Governors for the Texas Chapter of NARAS (The National Academy of Recording Arts and Sciences, currently known as The Recording Academy). He has also received a star on the South Texas Music Walk of Fame in Corpus Christi, Texas. However there have been some changes to the band lineup as Heather Stalling now plays the fiddle and the harmony vocals, the drums are still run by Jeff Howe, guitar is now run by Glenn Wallace, and bass is also still run by Jason Steinsultz. Max and Heather Stalling were married in 2007 and Heather plays in both her first band, Blacktop Gypsy and in her husbands, The Max Stalling band.

One of Stalling's most successful albums, Home to You, was released on August 17, 2010, on the Blind Nello Records label. It was produced by Grammy winner Lloyd Maines, and earned both a Best Album and a Best Male Vocal nomination for the 2011 LoneStarMusic Awards. The album's first single, "I Ain't Drinking Alone," was No. 14 on the Radio Free Texas 100 Most Requested Songs of 2010 list.

Home to You followed four previous studio projects: Comfort In the Curves in 1999 (which was released under the label E squared), Wide Afternoon in 2000, One of the Ways in 2002, and Topaz City in 2008. Stalling has also released two live albums: Sellout-Live at Dan's Silver Leaf in 2007 and Live From the Granada in 2009. Other albums include both Songs of Forbidden Love in 1998 and Genuine in 2003.

Stalling's studio album, Banquet, was released in 2015 and includes original music as well as covers of Dough Sahm and The Beatles. His most recent album is Live at the Mucky Duck: Portmanteau which was released in 2019.

Every album except for Comfort in the Curves was released on Blind Nello Records, a label run by Max Stalling, Kevin Deal, and Mark Manders. Blind Nello currently has a distribution deal with Sony.
