= Nothing Shines Like Neon =

Studio album by Randy Rogers Band
- Released: January 15, 2016
- Genre: Country
- Length: 37:18
- Label: Tommy Jackson
- Producer: Buddy Cannon

Randy Rogers Band chronology
Hold My Beer Vol. 1 (2015)	Nothing Shines Like Neon (2016)	Watch This (2016)

Singles from Nothing Shines Like Neon
- 1. "Neon Blues" Released: February 22, 2016

Nothing Shines Like Neon is the eighth studio album by the American country music ensemble Randy Rogers Band. Released on 15 January 2016 through Tommy Jackson Records, the album was produced by Buddy Cannon.

== Commercial performance ==
In the USA, the album debuted at No. 5 on Top Country Albums, and No. 47 on Billboard 200, selling 11,500 copies in its first week. It sold a further 2,300 copies in its second week. The album had sold 15,100 copies up to February 2016.

== Track listing ==
No.	Title	Writer(s)	Length
1.	"San Antone"	Keith Gattis	3:29
2.	"Rain and the Radio"	Sean McConnell, Randy Rogers	3:49
3.	"Neon Blues"	Derek George, Geoffrey Hill, Rogers	3:01
4.	"Things I Need to Quit"	Brent Anderson, Lynn Hutton, Brent Rupard	3:38
5.	"Look Out Yonder" (featuring Alison Krauss and Dan Tyminski)	Earl Bud Lee	3:24
6.	"Tequila Eyes"	Buddy Cannon, Dean Dillon, Rogers	4:17
7.	"Takin' It as It Comes" (duet with Jerry Jeff Walker)	Bobby Rambo	3:39
8.	"Old Moon New"	Lee Thomas Miller, Wendell Mobley, Rogers	3:33
9.	"Meet Me Tonight"	McConnell, Rogers	3:14
10.	"Actin' Crazy" (duet with Jamey Johnson)	Jamey Johnson, Rogers, George Teren	2:47
11.	"Pour One for the Poor One"	Cannon, Rogers	2:27
Total length:			37:18

== Personnel ==
Randy Rogers Band

- Brady Black - fiddle, background vocals
- Geoffrey Hill - electric guitar, background vocals
- Les Lawless - drums
- Jon Richardson - bass guitar, background vocals
- Randy Rogers - acoustic guitar, lead vocals

Additional musicians

- Jamey Johnson - duet vocals on "Actin' Crazy"
- Alison Krauss - background vocals on "Look Out Yonder"
- Randy McCormick - Hammond B-3 organ, piano, synthesizer, Wurlitzer
- John Ross Silva - background vocals
- Todd Stewart - mandolin, background vocals
- Bobby Terry - acoustic guitar, electric guitar, steel guitar
- Dan Tyminski - background vocals on "Look Out Yonder"
- Jerry Jeff Walker - duet vocals on "Takin' It as It Comes"
- Kyle Wieters - background vocals

== Chart performance ==
Chart (2016)	Peak position
US Billboard 200	47
US Top Country Albums (Billboard)	5
US Independent Albums (Billboard)	2
