= KTKO (FM) =

Coordinates: 28.4713°N 97.8110°W

- Beeville, Texas; United States
- Frequency: 105.7 MHz
- Branding: Texas Knockout 105.7

Programming
- Format: Red dirt and Texas country

Ownership
- Owner: Beeville Investments, LLC

History
- First air date: December 12, 1976
- Former call signs: KCWW (1976–1984); KIBL-FM (1984–1994)

Technical information
- Licensing authority: FCC
- Facility ID: 74442
- Class: C3
- ERP: 25,000 watts
- HAAT: 100 meters (330 ft)

Links
- Public license information: Public file; LMS

KTKO (105.7 FM) is a radio station licensed to Beeville, Texas. The station broadcasts a red dirt and Texas country format and is owned by Beeville Investments, LLC.

In May 2024, KTKO shifted its format to red dirt/Texas country, branded as "Texas Knockout 105.7".
