= KMIL =

Coordinates: 30.8483°N 96.9691°W

- Cameron, Texas; United States
- Frequency: 105.1 MHz
- Branding: 105.1 Shooter FM

Programming
- Format: Texas country

Ownership
- Owner: M&M Broadcasters, LTD.

History
- First air date: January 25, 2007
- Former call signs: KHTZ (1999–2004, CP); KNVR (2004–2007)

Technical information
- Licensing authority: FCC
- Facility ID: 84381
- Class: C3
- ERP: 15,000 watts
- HAAT: 100 meters (330 ft)

Links
- Public license information: Public file; LMS
- Webcast: Listen live
- Website: kmil.com

KMIL (105.1 FM) is a radio station airing a Texas country music format licensed to Cameron, Texas. It signed on in 1955 as an AM station located at 1330. The station broadcasts local news and local sports. It is owned by M&M Broadcasters, LTD.

The station's current Station Manager and Program Director is Billy Ray. Billy Ray is also the current morning show host.

Former management and staff include Gene "Unk" Smitherman, Silas Strausberger, Charlie McGregor, Joe Smitherman, Jeff Smitherman, Rob Reed, Chris Austin, Brett Eberhart, Joel Uvalle Jr., Donica Zabcik, Brian Smith, Rachelle Vogelsang, Kathy Pool, Casey Stanislaw, Mike Riggs, Ann Broussard, Robin Cunningham, Al Tag, Janice Corona, James Dickson, Nonito Martinez, Lina Ramon, Joy Reed, Alfred Vrazel, Porter Young, John Galure, Alan Wood, Frank Summers, Will “The Colonel” Sanders, and Rose Mondrik.

Previous logo
