= KZAH =

- Harper, Texas; United States
- Broadcast area: Kerrville, Texas; Fredericksburg, Texas
- Frequency: 99.1 MHz
- Branding: 99.1 The Buck

Programming
- Format: Red dirt country

Ownership
- Owner: JAM Broadcasting, LLC.
- Sister stations: KAXA, KERV, KRVL

History
- First air date: December 14, 2018

Technical information
- Licensing authority: FCC
- Facility ID: 198621
- Class: C3
- ERP: 23,000 watts
- HAAT: 104 meters (341 ft)
- Transmitter coordinates: 30°8′21.70″N 99°3′21.20″W

Links
- Public license information: Public file; LMS
- Webcast: Listen live
- Website: jambroadcasting.com

KZAH (99.1 FM) is a Red dirt country formatted broadcast radio station. The station is licensed to Harper, Texas and serves Harper, Kerrville, and Fredericksburg in Texas. KZAH is owned and operated by JAM Broadcasting, LLC.

On January 8, 2023, KZAH changed its format from adult hits (which moved to KAXA 103.7 FM Mountain Home) to Texas/Red Dirt country, branded as "99.1 The Buck".
