= Roger Creager =

American singer-songwriter

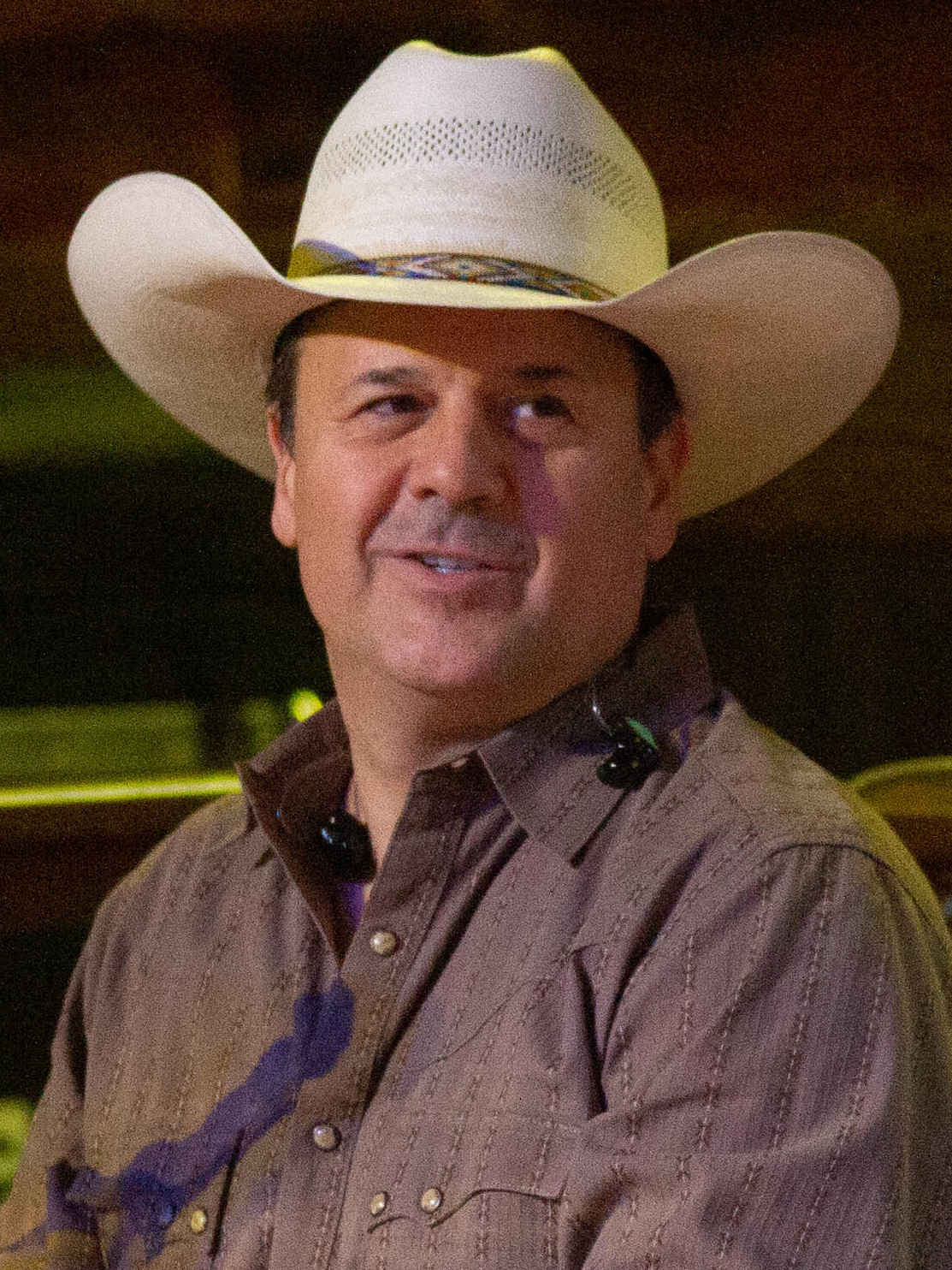
- Creager in 2019

Background information
- Born: July 25, 1971 (age 55)
- Origin: Corpus Christi, Texas
- Genre: Country
- Occupations: Country singer and songwriter
- Instrument: Guitar
- Years active: 1998–present
- Website: rogercreager.com

Roger Creager (born July 25, 1971) is an American Texas country music singer and songwriter from Corpus Christi, Texas.

== Biography ==
Creager was born on July 25, 1971, in Corpus Christi, Texas. Creager's aspiration to become a country music singer began when he was six years old. He began learning piano in second grade and began to learn guitar as a student at Tuloso-Midway High School. After high school, he attended Sam Houston State University and earned a degree in business. He then earned a degree in agriculture from Texas A&M University in College Station. During his time in College Station, the Texas Music Revolution helped him become a musician. In the summer of 2007, Creager traveled to France to take part in that year's Festival Country Rendez-Vous.

== Band members ==
Roger in Concert (Houston, Texas, 2005)

- Allen Huff (Huff Daddy) – piano, organ, accordion, vocals
- Jason Broussard – drums
- Jason Lerma – lead guitar, acoustic guitar
- Stormy Cooper – bass guitar
- Aleph Yonker – fiddle, lead guitar, vocals

Roger's father and brother, Bill and Randy Creager, occasionally join him on stage, providing vocals on songs such as "Rancho Grande" and "Please Come to Boston".

== Personal life ==
In August 2006, Creager traveled to Africa and climbed Mount Kilimanjaro.

Creager married his wife Chelsey in Ireland in November of 2021, with a stateside ceremony later that month. The couple share a daughter.

Creager lives in Houston, Texas.

== Discography ==
=== Albums ===
Title	Album details	Peak chart positions			
Title	Album details	US Country	US	US Heat	US Indie
Having Fun All Wrong	Release date: 1998; Label: Dualtone Records	—	—	—	—
I Got the Guns	Release date: 2000; Label: Dualtone Records	—	—	—	—
Long Way to Mexico	Release date: September 9, 2003; Label: Dualtone Records	63	—	—	—
Live Across Texas	Release date: September 7, 2004; Label: Dualtone Records	70	—	—	—
Here It Is	Release date: August 26, 2008; Label: Thirty Tigers	39	—	7	33
Surrender	Release date: January 17, 2012; Label: Thirty Tigers	39	—	10	42
Road Show	Release date: July 22, 2014; Label: Fun All Wrong Records	20	172	6	38
"—" denotes releases that did not chart

=== Extended plays ===
Title	Album details	Peak chart positions	
Title	Album details	US Country	US Heat
Gulf Coast Time	Release date: September 25, 2015; Label: Fun All Wrong Records	41	25

=== Music videos ===
Year	Video	Director
2008	"I'm from the Beer Joint"	
2013	"For You I Do"	Landers/Mash

=== Popular songs ===
- "The Everclear Song" (written by Mike Ethan Messick and released on the 1998 album Having Fun All Wrong)
- "Fun All Wrong" (on the 1998 album Having Fun All Wrong)
- "I Got the Guns" (on the 2000 album I Got the Guns)
- "Love" (on the 2000 album I Got the Guns)
- "Rancho Grande" (on the 2000 album I Got the Guns)
- "Things Look Good Around Here" (on the 2000 album I Got the Guns)
- "Long Way to Mexico" (on the 2003 album Long Way to Mexico)
- "Love Is Crazy" (on the 2003 album Long Way to Mexico)
- "Love Is So Sweet"
- "A Good Day for Sunsets"
- "I'm from the Beer Joint"
- "Bad Friend to a Good Man"
