= KAXA =

- Mountain Home, Texas; United States
- Broadcast area: Kerrville, Texas
- Frequency: 103.7 MHz
- Branding: 103.7 Mike FM

Programming
- Format: Adult hits

Ownership
- Owner: Justin McClure; (Jam Broadcasting, LLC)

History
- First air date: 2012
- Former call signs: KMHO (2008–2012, CP)

Technical information
- Licensing authority: FCC
- Facility ID: 170976
- Class: A
- ERP: 6,000 watts
- HAAT: 57 meters (187 ft)
- Transmitter coordinates: 30°10′34″N 99°23′02″W

Links
- Public license information: Public file; LMS
- Webcast: Listen live
- Website: jambroadcasting.com/radio/mike

KAXA (103.7 FM) is a radio station licensed to Mountain Home, Texas. The station broadcasts an adult hits format and is owned by Justin McClure, through licensee Jam Broadcasting, LLC. KAXA 103.7 FM serves the Kerrville, Texas area.

On January 8, 2023, KAXA changed their format from country (which moved to KZAH 99.1 FM Harper) to adult hits, branded as "103.7 Mike FM".

Also in 2023 morning show host Mikaela Jade Taylor came out as a transgender woman and invited listeners to follow her journey.
