= Trouble (Randy Rogers Band album) =

Studio album by Randy Rogers Band
- Released: April 30, 2013
- Genre: Country
- Length: 40:50
- Label: MCA Nashville
- Producer: Jay Joyce

Randy Rogers Band chronology
Burning the Day (2010)	Trouble (2013)	Homemade Tamales – Live at Floore's (2014)

Trouble is the sixth studio album by the American country music group Randy Rogers Band. It was released on April 30, 2013, via MCA Nashville. The album includes the singles "One More Sad Song", "Trouble Knows My Name" and "Fuzzy".

== Critical reception ==
Stephen Thomas Erlewine of AllMusic rated the album three stars out of five, saying that its sound was "professional" and praising the variety of sounds on it, but also saying that it was "just a shade too slick". Tammy Ragusa of Country Weekly gave it a "B", praising Rogers' voice and saying that "the results are exciting, the sound is effortless... and, make no mistake, it is country." A positive review came from Matt Bjorke of Roughstock, who said that Jay Joyce's production made the album "vibrant and fresh without ever losing the identity that fans have come to love from them."

== Track listing ==
1. "Goodbye Lonely" (Randy Rogers, Sean McConnell) — 3:19
2. "Fuzzy" (Shane McAnally, Josh Osborne, Trevor Rosen) — 3:20
3. "Speak of the Devil" (Sarah Buxton, Jedd Hughes, Ashley Gorley) — 4:02
4. "Flash Flood" (Rogers, Brad Tursi, Josh Hoge) — 3:08
5. "Trouble Knows My Name (Feat. Willie Nelson)" (Rogers, Geoffrey Hill) — 4:03
6. "One More Sad Song" (Rogers, McConnell) — 3:51
7. "If I Had Another Heart" (Radney Foster, Gordie Sampson) — 3:57
8. "Don't Deserve You" (Rogers, Jeremy Spillman, Jay Joyce) — 3:54
9. "Had to Give That up Too" (Keith Gattis, Jamie Wilson, Savannah Welch) — 3:50
10. "Shotgun" (Jon Richardson) — 3:52
11. "Never Got Around to That" (Rogers, Dean Dillon, Dale Dodson) — 3:34

== Personnel ==
=== Randy Rogers Band ===
- Brady Black — fiddle, background vocals
- Geoffrey Hill — electric guitar, background vocals
- Les Lawless — drums
- Jon Richardson — bass guitar, Moog Taurus, background vocals
- Randy Rogers — lead vocals, acoustic guitar

=== Additional musicians ===
- Gary Allan — background vocals on "Flash Flood"
- Ray Wylie Hubbard — electric guitar, background vocals
- Jedd Hughes — Dobro, acoustic guitar, baritone guitar, mandolin, background vocals
- Jay Joyce — acoustic guitar, electric guitar, Hammond B-3 organ, piano
- Willie Nelson — acoustic guitar and guest vocals on "Trouble Knows My Name"
- Mickey Raphael — harmonica on "Trouble Knows My Name"
- Giles Reaves — Fender Rhodes, Hammond B-3 organ, percussion, pump organ, synthesizer, Wurlitzer electric piano

=== Technical ===
- Jason Hall —engineer
- Scott Johnson — production assistant
- Jay Joyce — production
- Andrew Mendelson — mastering
- Matthew Wheeler — assistant engineer

== Chart performance ==
Chart (2013)	Peak position
US Billboard 200	9
US Top Country Albums (Billboard)	3
