= KRVL =

- Kerrville, Texas; United States
- Broadcast area: Kerrville, Texas
- Frequency: 94.3 MHz
- Branding: Rev FM

Programming
- Format: Active rock

Ownership
- Owner: Justin McClure, Angela Krause, and Michael Krause; (JAM Broadcasting, LLC)
- Sister stations: KZAH

History
- First air date: 1975 (as KERV-FM)
- Former call signs: KERV-FM (1982–1984)

Technical information
- Licensing authority: FCC
- Facility ID: 25380
- Class: C2
- ERP: 33,000 watts
- HAAT: 122 meters (400 ft)
- Transmitter coordinates: 30°15′8.00″N 99°8′1.00″W

Links
- Public license information: Public file; LMS
- Webcast: Listen Live
- Website: revfm.rocks

KRVL (94.3 FM) is a radio station licensed to Kerrville, Texas, United States. It broadcasts an active rock format as "Rev FM". The station is currently owned by Justin McClure, Angela Krause, and Michael Krause, through licensee JAM Broadcasting, LLC.

== History ==
The station was assigned the call letters KERV-FM on June 14, 1982. On December 1, 1984, the station changed its call sign to the current KRVL. On June 12, 2007, the station was sold to Foster Charitable Foundation, Inc.

Effective August 2, 2018, Foster Charitable Foundation sold KRVL to JAM Broadcasting, LLC for $250,000.

== On-air personalities ==
Mornings - Cody, Coach, and Leslee
Afternoons - Becka Grey
Sports - Mark Keller
Weather - Cary Burgess
News - Michelle Layton
