= Wade Bowen =

American singer-songwriter

- Born: Paul Wade Bowen; October 18, 1978 (age 48)
- Origin: Waco, Texas, U.S.
- Genres: Country; red dirt; Texas country
- Years active: 2000–present
- Labels: BNA; Columbia
- Website: wadebowen.com

Paul Wade Bowen (born October 18, 1978) is an American Texas country and red dirt singer from Waco, Texas, United States.

Bowen was a member of the band West 84 with friend Matt Miller until 2001 when the group became known as Wade Bowen and West 84. He released his first album in 2002, Try Not To Listen, which became a regional hit in Texas. He released his first live album in 2003, recorded live at The Blue Light in Lubbock, Texas, followed by studio albums Lost Hotel in 2006 and If We Ever Make It Home in 2008. On November 21, 2009, Bowen recorded his second live album at Billy Bob's Texas in Fort Worth. The album was released on April 27, 2010, as a CD/DVD combo.

Bowen released his fourth studio album, The Given, in 2010. It was his first on a major label, Sony imprint BNA Records, though he returned to releasing music independently after BNA closed. He released a self-titled studio album in 2014, followed by a duets album in 2015 with singer Randy Rogers of the Randy Rogers Band, titled Hold My Beer Vol. 1. Bowen's next album was Then Sings My Soul: Songs for My Mother, a solo gospel-influenced studio release. He has released three more albums: Watch This, with Randy Rogers, Solid Ground, released in 2018, and a follow-up to Hold My Beer Vol. 1, titled Hold My Beer Vol. 2, with Randy Rogers.

During the COVID-19 pandemic of 2020, Wade started a web series of live shows called Wade's World, where he hosted other prominent Texas musicians to play and tell stories about their songs every Friday night. Guests included Bruce Robison, Cody Canada, Jack Ingram, and others.

In September of 2026, he released his eleventh studio album The Version of Me You Get.

== Personal life ==
Bowen is the brother-in-law of Cross Canadian Ragweed frontman Cody Canada and is a graduate of Texas Tech University, where he is a member of the Epsilon Nu chapter of the Sigma Chi fraternity.

== Discography ==
=== Albums ===
Title	Album details	Peak chart positions					Sales
Title	Album details	US Country	US	US Folk	US Heat	US Indie	Sales
Try Not to Listen	Release date: May 14, 2002; Label: New Texas Records	—	—	—	—	—	
The Blue Light Live	Release date: September 14, 2004; Label: Sustain Records	—	—	—	—	—	
Lost Hotel	Release date: February 21, 2006; Label: Sustain Records	—	—	—	—	—	
If We Ever Make It Home	Release date: September 20, 2008; Label: Sustain Records	29	176	—	2	—	
Live at Billy Bob's Texas	Release date: April 27, 2010; Label: Smith Music Group	41	—	—	16	50	
The Given	Release date: May 29, 2012; Label: BNA Records	9	44	—	—	—	
Wade Bowen	Release date: October 28, 2014; Label: Amp Records	9	47	—	—	8	US: 13,800
Hold My Beer, Vol. 1 (with Randy Rogers)	Release date: April 20, 2015; Label: Lil' Buddy Toons	4	37	—	—	3	US: 14,000
Then Sings My Soul: Songs for My Mother	Release date: March 18, 2016; Label: Bowen Sounds	18	—	—	—	14	US: 3,300
Watch This (with Randy Rogers)	Release date: June 3, 2016; Label: Lil' Buddy Toons	21	—	8	—	19	
Solid Ground	Released: February 9, 2018; Label: Lil' Buddy Toons	27	—	10	—	7	
Hold My Beer, Vol. 2 (with Randy Rogers)	Release date: May 8, 2020; Label: Lil' Buddy Toons	—	—	—	—	—	
Somewhere Between the Secret and the Truth	Release date: August 12, 2022; Label: Thirty Tigers	—	—	—	—	—	
The Version of Me You Get	Release date: September 25, 2026; Label: Thirty Tigers						
"—" denotes releases that did not chart

=== Singles ===
Year	Single	Peak positions	Album
Year	Single	US Country	Album
2011	"Saturday Night"	39	The Given
2012	"To Live Is to Fly"	—	The Given
2013	"Songs About Trucks"	—	—N/a
2013	"Another Song Nobody Will Hear" (with Will Hoge)	—	—N/a
2014	"When I Woke Up Today"	—	Wade Bowen
2024	"Rainin on Me"	—	Flyin
"—" denotes releases that did not chart

=== Music videos ===
Year	Video	Director
2006	"God Bless This Town"	Matheson Muir
2009	"Trouble"	Evan Kaufmann
2012	"Saturday Night" (Acoustic)	Deaton Flanigen
2013	"Songs About Trucks"	Rose/Weems
2014	"When I Woke Up Today"	Trey Fanjoy
2015	"Standards" (with Randy Rogers)	The Edde Brothers
2020	"Rodeo Clown" (with Randy Rogers)	Tim Duggan
