= Randy Rogers Band =

American country music band

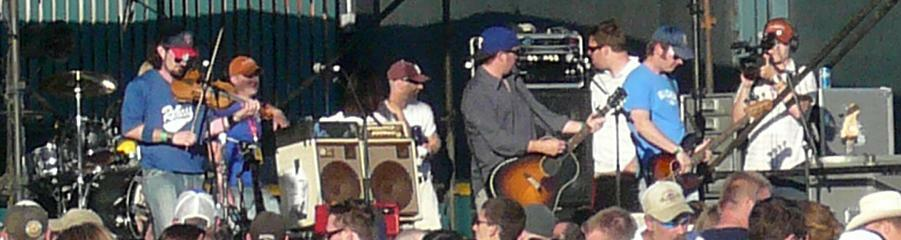
- Randy Rogers Band in 2009

Background information
- Origin: San Marcos, Texas, United States
- Genres: Texas country, Red Dirt, country
- Years active: 2000-present
- Labels: Mercury Nashville; MCA Nashville; Thirty Tigers
- Members: Randy Rogers; Brady Black; Geoffrey Hill; Les Lawless; Jon Richardson; Todd Stewart
- Website: http://randyrogersband.com

Randy Rogers Band is an American country music band from San Marcos, Texas. The band is composed of Randy Rogers (lead vocals), Geoffrey Hill (guitar), Jon Richardson (bass guitar), Brady Black (fiddle), Les Lawless (drums), and Todd Stewart (guitar, fiddle, mandolin, keyboards). They have recorded seven studio albums and two live albums, and have charted seven singles on the Billboard Hot Country Songs charts.

== Biography ==
Randy Rogers was born in Cleburne, Texas. At the age of 6 years, he learned to play the piano from his grandmother, and later started playing the guitar.

The Randy Rogers Band recorded its debut album, Live at Cheatham Street Warehouse, at a music hall of the same name in San Marcos, Texas. By 2002, the band was signed to the independent Downtime record label, on which they released the album Like It Used to Be. It was around this time that the band began performing outside of San Marcos, primarily at Nutty Brown Cafe and Amphitheatre in nearby Dripping Springs, Texas. Two years later, the album Rollercoaster was released, producing two minor entries on the Billboard Hot Country Songs charts in early 2005. Rogers also co-wrote "Somebody Take Me Home", a song recorded by Kenny Chesney, on his 2005 album, The Road and the Radio. Several of the songs on Rollercoaster were co-written by Radney Foster, who also co-produced the album. Just a Matter of Time, the band's first major-label album, was released on Mercury Nashville Records in 2006. The band also released their self-titled album on September 23, 2008, also on Mercury Nashville Records. The first single, "In My Arms Instead", was released in August.

The band's fifth album, Burning the Day, was released on August 24, 2010, on MCA Nashville. The album's first single was "Too Late for Goodbye." It debuted at 55 on the U.S. Billboard Hot Country Songs chart and after four weeks on the chart, it peaked at 47.

"One More Sad Song" was released in late 2012. The song became the band's first Billboard Top 40 hit, and the first single from their sixth album, Trouble.

Dreamer: A Tribute to Kent Finlay, released in 2016 on Austin-based Eight 30 Records, features Randy Rogers and Sunny Sweeney's duet "Between You and Me".

== Pop Culture ==
Randy Rogers Band and their song “Speak of the Devil” referenced in Showtime TV series Billions (“STD” 21:04).

== Discography ==
=== Studio albums ===
Title	Album details	Peak chart positions			
Title	Album details	US Country	US	US Folk	US Indie
Like It Used to Be	Release date: June 25, 2002; Label: Downtime Records	—	—	—	—
Rollercoaster	Release date: August 24, 2004; Label: Smith Music Group	—	—	—	—
Just a Matter of Time	Release date: September 12, 2006; Label: Mercury Nashville	8	61	—	—
Randy Rogers Band	Release date: September 23, 2008; Label: Mercury Nashville	3	29	—	—
Burning the Day	Release date: August 24, 2010; Label: MCA Nashville	2	8	—	—
Trouble	Release date: April 30, 2013; Label: MCA Nashville	3	9	—	—
Hold My Beer, Vol. 1 (Randy Rogers with Wade Bowen)	Release date: April 20, 2015; Label: Lil' Buddy Toons	4	37	—	3
Nothing Shines Like Neon	Release date: January 15, 2016; Label: Tommy Jackson Records	5	47	—	2
Hellbent	Release date: April 26, 2019; Label: Tommy Jackson Records / Thirty Tigers	—	—	—	—
Hold My Beer, Vol. 2 (Randy Rogers with Wade Bowen)	Release date: May 8, 2020; Label: Lil' Buddy Toons	—	—	—	—
Homecoming	Release date: October 14, 2022; Label: Thirty Tigers	—	—	—	—
"—" denotes releases that did not chart

=== Live albums ===
Title	Album details	Peak chart positions		
Title	Album details	US Country	US	US Indie
Live at Cheatham Street Warehouse	Release date: 2000; Label: Smith Music Group; Formats: CD, cassette	—	—	—
Live at Billy Bob's Texas	Release date: August 16, 2005; Label: Smith Music Group; Formats: CD, download	62	—	—
Homemade Tamales – Live at Floore's	Release date: April 15, 2014; Label: Room 8 Records; Formats: CD, download	11	70	14
Watch This (Randy Rogers with Wade Bowen)	Release date: June 3, 2016; Label: Lil' Buddy Toons; Formats: CD, music download	21	—	19
"—" denotes releases that did not chart

=== Singles ===
Year	Single	Peak chart positions			Certifications	Album
Year	Single	US Country	US Country Airplay	US Bubbling	Certifications	Album
2005	"Tonight's Not the Night (For Goodbye)"	43	—	—		Rollercoaster
2005	"Down and Out"	48	—	—		Rollercoaster
2006	"Kiss Me in the Dark"	43	—	—	RIAA: Platinum	Just a Matter of Time
2007	"One More Goodbye"	53	—	—		Just a Matter of Time
2008	"In My Arms Instead"	52	—	—	RIAA: Platinum	Randy Rogers Band
2010	"Too Late for Goodbye"	47	—	—		Burning the Day
2010	"Steal You Away"	—	—	—		Burning the Day
2012	"One More Sad Song"	38	37	21		Trouble
2013	"Trouble Knows My Name"	—	—	—		Trouble
2013	"Fuzzy"	—	—	—		Trouble
2014	"Satellite"	—	—	—		Homemade Tamales – Live at Floore's
2016	"Neon Blues"	—	—	—	RIAA: Platinum	Nothing Shines Like Neon
2017	"Tequila Eyes"	—	—	—		Nothing Shines Like Neon
"—" denotes releases that did not chart

=== Other certified songs ===
Year	Single	Certifications	Album
2008	"Buy Myself a Chance"	RIAA: Gold	Randy Rogers Band

=== Music videos ===
Year	Video	Director
2006	"Kiss Me in the Dark"	Shaun Silva
2007	"One More Goodbye"	The Brads
2008	"In My Arms Instead"	Andy Wherspann
2010	"Interstate"	Stephen Shepherd
2012	"One More Sad Song"	Stephen Shepherd
2013	"Fuzzy"	Stephen Shepherd
2014	"Satellite"	The Edde Brothers
2015	"Standards" (Randy Rogers with Wade Bowen)	The Edde Brothers
2016	"Neon Blues"	The Edde Brothers
2016	"San Antone"	The Edde Brothers
2017	"Meet Me Tonight"	
2020	"Rodeo Clown" (Randy Rogers with Wade Bowen)	Tim Duggan
