= Texas country music =

Music genre

- Stylistic origins: Country; Western; outlaw country
- Cultural origins: Late 1960s, Texas, United States
- Typical instruments: Acoustic guitar; electric guitar; steel guitar; bass guitar; percussion; banjo; mandolin; Dobro; fiddle; piano; harmonica
- Derivative forms: Neotraditional country; progressive country; red dirt

Texas country music (more popularly known simply as Texas country or Texas music) is a subgenre of country music from Texas. Texas country is a style of Western music and is often associated with other distinct neighboring styles, including red dirt from Oklahoma, the New Mexico music of New Mexico, and Tejano in Texas, all of which have influenced one another over the years, and are popular throughout Texas, the Midwest, the Southwest, and other parts of the Western United States. Texas country is known for fusing neotraditional country with the outspoken, care-free views of outlaw country. Texas country blends these sub-genres with a "common working man" theme and witty undertones, these often combine with a stripped down music sound.

Being a Texas country artist is more about musical/scene affiliation than where the artist was born or raised. Neither the location of birth nor the location of upbringing defines a Texas country artist, as long as the origin is not in the corporate Nashville scene, as the genre tends to be anti-Nashville. The genre differentiates from Nashville country with its rejection of pop influences that is often found in Nashville country, but does not necessarily mean the artist/group is Texas-based. For example, Chris Knight is considered by some to be a Texas country musician, despite his Kentucky ties. Adam Hood, an Alabama native, also has had success in the genre. Even international musicians, such as Alberta, Canada native Corb Lund, have been successful in the Texas country scene.

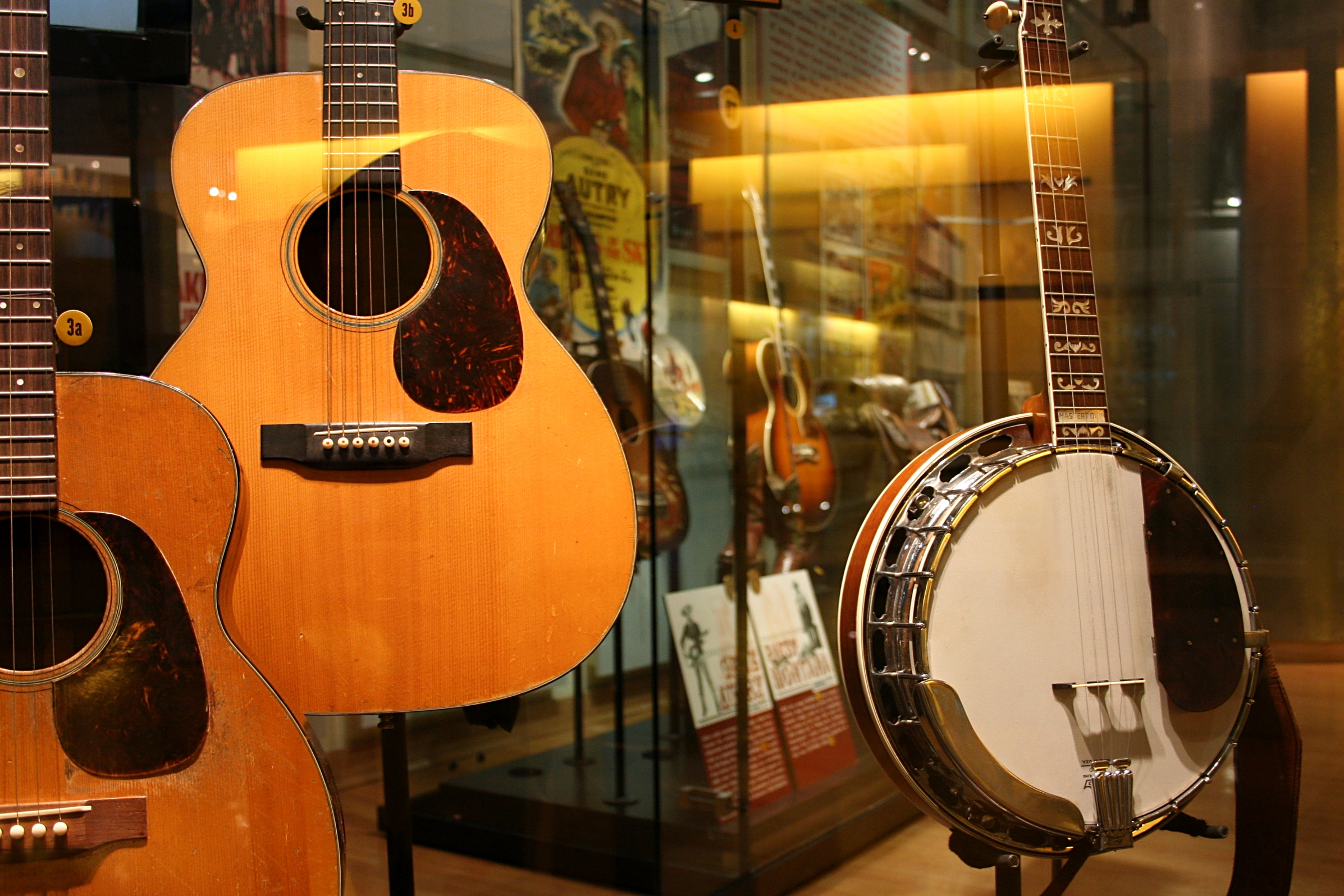
Country Music Instrumentation

== Instrumentation ==
Texas country music develops from multiple regional traditions, with its instrumentation reflecting the blend of those influences. Frontier dance‑hall music shapes early Texas country, where fiddles and guitars carry both melody and rhythm. Fiddlers often adapt regional folk melodies to suit local dance styles, helping Texas country maintain a strong connection to community gatherings and frontier social life.

As Texas country music spreads through the early 20th century, Western swing adds a new layer. It mixes old fiddle tunes with jazz‑style arrangements and amplified rhythm sections, creating a livelier sound that fits Texas dance halls. Historians note that Western swing helps define Texas country’s identity through its use of fiddles. Bands such as those led by Bob Wills popularize this fusion, showing how Texas musicians blend rural string traditions with the swing rhythms emerging from urban jazz scenes.

Honky-tonk music contributes to the genre’s evolution; as dance halls expand, performers adopt electric guitars, steel guitars, and amplified rhythm sections to suit larger audiences. The honky‑tonk era also marks a shift toward smaller ensembles that emphasize rhythm and vocal storytelling, reflecting the genre’s move from dance halls to roadside bars. This shift toward amplified instruments becomes part of the modern Texas country sound.

Texas’s mix of cultures shapes its music too. The state’s blend of Anglo, Mexican, German, and African American traditions influence the instruments. This cultural blending encourages experimentation, as musicians borrow rhythmic patterns and instrumentation from Tejano and blues styles to create a more distinctive regional sound.

By the mid‑1900s, Texas country bands increasingly add electric leads as performances become more professional. Later, in the 1970s, progressive country artists combine traditional Texas instruments with rock elements, creating a hybrid style that changes how people see country music in Texas. Progressive country’s mix of electric and acoustic instruments reflects broader cultural changes in Texas, where artists seek to bridge traditional roots with modern influences.

== Vocals ==
The line of delineation for vocals is unclear. Traditionally, the Texas country scene has been a male dominated genre, however many women have had chart success. The Texas "anthem" is a common song type, referencing and sometimes embellishing on the different positive characteristics of the state. Many of these types of songs have been popular on the Texas music charts.

== Live performances ==
The live performance is at the very root of the Texas country scene. Enthusiasm is the best descriptor for both band and crowd at a live Texas country performance. "It is not an uncommon sight to see clubs all over Texas packed to the rafters; girls and boys in cowboy hats and Wranglers two-stepping next to the mosh pit, where college boys or "Man Fans" in khakis and college girls pressed up against the stage". An important factor Texas country's success is in the frequency of live performances. It is not uncommon for a Texas country band to tour 200+ dates a year, all, or nearly all, in the state of Texas. This allows the fan to attend a band's show more often, thus interacting with the music on a more personal level. Popular venues include, Gruene Hall (Gruene), Billy Bob's (Ft. Worth), Cowboys Red River (Dallas and San Antonio), John T. Floore's Country Store (Helotes), Luckenbach Dance Hall (near Fredericksburg), and Blue Light Live (Lubbock).

In addition to local and state wide venues hosting live performances, the Texas Regional Radio Report hosts the annual Texas Regional Radio Music Awards Show where Texas red dirt artists and radio stations are recognized for the outstanding achievements throughout the year. The winners in 25 categories are nominated and voted on by fans, friends and industry professionals and are awarded the night of the show. The voting membership has grown to over 32,000 voting members in five years and continues to expand every year. The awards show is open to the public and fans alike who cheer on their favorite artist/entertainers and radio stations.

== Themes ==
Lyrical content is the backbone of Texas country music. Country music outlaw Willie Nelson was inspired by his friend Waylon Jennings, a country legend and inspiration to present Texas country musicians himself, when he said “Your melody goes where the words take you”.

There are 4 different types of themes in country music. These themes include the following categories: "It's All Over" (songs with a core theme of loss or regret), "It's Not Working Out" (songs with a focus on frustration over a relationship), "Love and Devotion" (sappy love songs) and "The Right Way to Live" (songs with a dominant theme of pride and homespun wisdom).

Songs about traditional dance halls, open roads, family farms and hometown bars, along with other illustrations of Texas landscape, are all found in present-day Texas country artists' catalogs. The ties of landscape and music seem to serve as remembrance and gratitude, as evident in most songs. Appreciation for surroundings is not the only limitation for this theme. The "average man" and his struggle with nature do appear as well. "The songs definitely incorporate a spirit of the times and constitute a spontaneous and fairly comprehensive record of life".

== History ==
=== Origins ===
Country music from Texas has been popular since the spread of the cowboy culture in the late 1800s. Texas helped popularize country music throughout the world and the state's rich and varied traditions continue to redefine country music.

Texas country's roots lie in the outlaw country movement of the 1960s and 1970s. Texan artists such as George Strait, Waylon Jennings, Willie Nelson, and David Allan Coe retreated from the Nashville country music scene to Austin, Luckenbach, and Houston. Other artists who were inspired by this movement included performers like Guy Clark, Jerry Jeff Walker, Gary P. Nunn, Steve Young, Kris Kristofferson, Joe Ely, Terry Allen, Steve Earle, and Townes Van Zandt. All of these have rated higher than 43 on the Texas Music Scene charts.

These artists were followed in turn by the work of singer-songwriters such as Robert Earl Keen, Lyle Lovett, Wayne Hancock, Kevin Fowler, Roger Creager, Pat Green, Cory Morrow, Radney Foster, Max Stalling, Wade Bowen, George Ducas, Randy Rogers, and Rich O'Toole.

While the genre has roots in Texas, Oklahoma artists such as Jason Boland, Stoney LaRue, Mike McClure, and Cross Canadian Ragweed have had a major influence on Texas country. For this reason, "red dirt music" is becoming a more popular term for the genre to pay homage to its Oklahoma influence. The term was coined in reference to the miles of red dirt that is common throughout the two states. George Strait has the most songs about Texas. “Amarillo by Morning” and “All My Exes Live in Texas” are his most popular Texas songs.

=== 1990s ===
Robert Earl Keen's No. 2 Live Dinner, released in 1996, featured comedic elements accompanied with "a sharp wit, a laid-back cowboy style, and an eye for detail... combined in [his] songs that are as easy on the ears as they are packed with insight". Keen's home calling came after a short stint in Nashville, where he quickly became uncomfortable. His 1996 live album release truly showcased the “wide range” of the talented Texas musician and popularized the single "The Road Goes On Forever", a song many music fans regard as the paradigm for Texas 'Country anthems'. Joe Ely and other Texas musicians have recorded cover versions of “The Road Goes On Forever”.

=== 2000s and the Texas influence in Nashville ===
Cory Morrow, a Houston native, had been on the Texas scene since the mid-1990s. With the release of his fourth album Outside the Lines, Morrow found more mainstream success on the country music charts. Pat Green, also an artist from Texas, began his career as part of the Texas country scene then later went on to widespread commercial success with the gold album Wave on Wave after switching to a "Shania Twain / Garth Brooks" Nashville style of country music. The album's title track hit No. 3 on the U.S. Billboard Hot Country Songs chart and won a Grammy nomination for Best Country Song.

Kevin Fowler, a former hair-metal/glam rocker was Dangerous Toys' guitarist from the late 1980s until 1993, followed by his own founding of Thunderfoot, a Southern rock band based out of Austin. Originally from Amarillo, he self-released his country debut album One for the Road in 1997. This followed with his smash independent follow-up album, Beer, Bait, and Ammo. He has since found national success, on a major label.

Texas country's influence continues to be felt in the mainstream music genre with artists such as Jack Ingram, who had already established a name for himself in Texas country, and who won a CMT Music Award in 2007 and the 2008 Academy of Country Music award for New Male Vocalist of the Year. He has also scored top 25 singles on the Billboard Hot Country Songs chart with songs such as "Love You" and his cover of Hinder's "Lips of an Angel". Another one of his singles, "Wherever You Are", went to number one on the Billboard chart.

Many independent artists, which is the fastest growing segment of the global recorded music business, have gained commercial success through the Texas music scene, with many albums debuting in the top 5 of Billboard's Top Country Album sales.

== Radio stations ==
=== Internet ===
- Texas Country Mix (Internet Radio)
- GotRadio Texas Best (Internet Radio)

=== Terrestrial (AM/FM) ===
- KFLP 106.1 Floydada/Plainview/Lubbock, Texas
- KZAH 99.1 Harper, Texas
- KFWR 95.9 Fort Worth, Texas
- KFYN 104.3 Paris, Texas
- KILT 100.3 HD2 Houston, Texas
- KKBQ 92.9 HD3 Pasadena, Texas
- KNBT 92.1 New Braunfels, Texas
- KRVF 106.9 Corsciana, Texas
- KMIL 105.1 Cameron, Texas
- KPUR 95.7 Amarillo, Texas
- KRMX 104.9 Waco, Texas
- KRVA 107.1 Campbell, Texas
- KSTV 93.1 Stephenville, Texas
- KMWX 92.5 Abilene, Texas
- KKHR 101.7 Abilene, Texas
- KTEX 106.1 Brenham, Texas
- KWHI 101.7 Brenham, Texas
- KRBL 107.7 Lubbock, Texas
- KZAH 99.1 Kerrville, Texas
- KTKO 105.7 Beeville, Texas
- KVMK 100.9 Bryan/College Station, Texas
- KHYI 95.3 Dallas, Texas

== Syndicated radio programs ==
Several regionally syndicated programs feature the format:

- CDTex Radio Show
- Official Texas Countdown
- Scotty Bennett's Texas Nights
- The Red River Radio Show with Bryson
- Radio Texas Live with Buddy Logan

== Tracking and charts ==
Radio play in Texas music is tracked and reported digitally by the Texas Country Music Chart and TractionTX using the highest level of technology. Radio airplay is still physically reported by the Texas Regional Radio Report.

Many of Texas country artists maintain a yearly membership with the Texas Country Music Association, a community of touring and recording artists, songwriters, and many other contributors to the Texas music industry.

Royal Caribbean International and Luxx Vacations have partnered with various sponsors to host a Texas Country Music Cruise on the Liberty of the Seas, featuring many Texas music artists such as Cory Morrow, William Clark Green, and Bri Bagwell.
