= Zach Bryan discography =

Recordings of American singer-songwriter

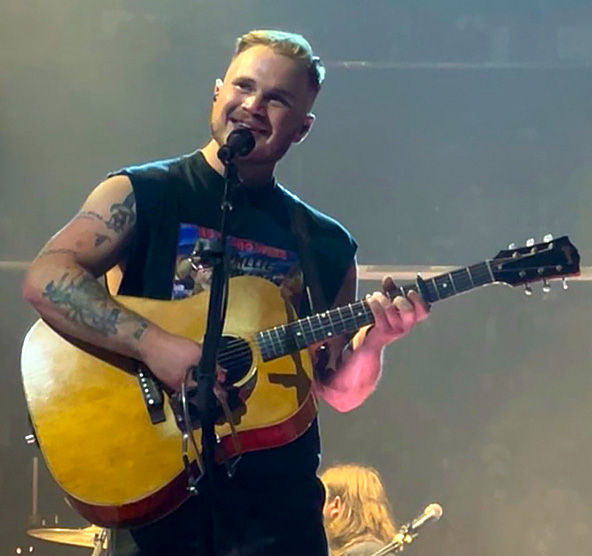
- Bryan performing at Crypto.com Arena in August 2023
- Studio albums: 6
- EPs: 5
- Live albums: 2
- Singles: 24

American singer-songwriter Zach Bryan has released six studio albums, two live albums, five extended plays, and twenty-four singles. His first album, DeAnn, was released in 2019, which was followed by a second album Elisabeth in 2020. He achieved his breakthrough in 2022 with his third album American Heartbreak and its single "Something in the Orange", which reached the top five on the Billboard 200 and top 10 on the Billboard Hot 100, respectively. His fourth album, Zach Bryan (2023), topped the Billboard 200, and its lead single "I Remember Everything" (a duet with Kacey Musgraves), was No. 1 on the Hot 100. Bryan’s fifth album, The Great American Bar Scene (2024), was No. 2 on the Billboard 200 and spawned the Hot 100 top-ten single, "Pink Skies". His sixth album With Heaven on Top (2026) became his second Billboard 200 chart-topping album.

== Albums ==
=== Studio albums ===
| Title | Details | Peak chart positions | | | | | | | | | | Certifications |
| Title | Details | US | AUS | BEL (FL) | CAN | IRE | NLD | NOR | NZ | SWE | UK | Certifications |
|---|---|---|---|---|---|---|---|---|---|---|---|---|
| DeAnn | Released: August 24, 2019; Label: Self-released; Formats: Digital download, streaming | 167 | — | — | — | — | — | — | — | — | — | RIAA: Platinum; MC: Platinum |
| Elisabeth | Released: May 8, 2020; Label: Self-released; Formats: Digital download, streaming | 76 | — | — | 49 | — | — | — | — | — | — | RIAA: Platinum; MC: 2× Platinum |
| American Heartbreak | Released: May 20, 2022; Label: Warner; Formats: Digital download, streaming, vinyl, CD | 5 | 54 | — | 4 | 1 | — | — | 40 | — | — | RIAA: 3× Platinum; BPI: Gold; MC: 6× Platinum; RMNZ: 2× Platinum |
| Zach Bryan | Released: August 25, 2023; Label: Warner; Formats: Digital download, streaming, vinyl, CD | 1 | 2 | — | 1 | 2 | — | 6 | 1 | 34 | 22 | RIAA: 3× Platinum; ARIA: Gold; BPI: Gold; MC: 5× Platinum; RMNZ: 2× Platinum |
| The Great American Bar Scene | Released: July 4, 2024; Label: Warner; Formats: Digital download, streaming, vinyl, CD | 2 | 14 | 164 | 1 | 2 | 58 | 10 | 4 | 2 | 16 | RIAA: Platinum; BPI: Gold; MC: 3× Platinum; RMNZ: Platinum |
| With Heaven on Top | Released: January 9, 2026; Label: Belting Bronco, Warner; Formats: Digital download, streaming, CD, LP | 1 | 4 | 109 | 1 | 1 | 20 | 5 | 5 | 3 | 3 | RIAA: Gold; BPI: Silver; MC: Platinum |
"—" denotes a recording that did not chart in that territory.

=== Live albums ===
| Title | Details | Peak chart positions | | | |
| Title | Details | US | US Folk | US Country | US Rock |
|---|---|---|---|---|---|
| All My Homies Hate Ticketmaster (Live from Red Rocks) | Released: December 25, 2022; Label: Warner; Formats: Digital download, streaming | 88 | 3 | 14 | 9 |
| 24 (Live) | Released: December 20, 2024; Label: Warner; Formats: Digital download, streaming | — | 20 | — | — |
"—" denotes a recording that did not chart in that territory.

== Extended plays ==
| Title | Details | Peak chart positions | | | | | | | | | | Certifications |
| Title | Details | US | US Country | US Folk | US Rock | AUS | CAN | IRE | NZ | SWE | UK | Certifications |
|---|---|---|---|---|---|---|---|---|---|---|---|---|
| Quiet, Heavy Dreams | Released: November 27, 2020; Label: Self-released; Formats: Digital download, streaming | — (Note: Quiet, Heavy Dreams did not enter the Billboard 200 chart, but peaked at number 8 on the Top Heatseekers chart.) | — | 19 | — | — | — | — | — | — | — | RIAA: Gold; MC: Gold |
| Studio A Recordings (Note: Studio A Recordings is not counted as an EP by some music outlets) | Released: February 19, 2021; Label: Warner; Formats: Digital download, streaming | — | — | — | — | — | — | — | — | — | — | |
| Summertime Blues | Released: July 15, 2022; Label: Warner; Formats: Digital download, streaming, vinyl | 34 | 7 | 2 | 4 | 100 | 77 | — | — | — | — | RIAA: Platinum; MC: Platinum; RMNZ: Gold |
| Boys of Faith | Released: September 22, 2023; Label: Warner; Formats: Digital download, streaming | 8 | 3 | 2 | 2 | — | 8 | — | 25 | — | — | RIAA: Gold; MC: Platinum; RMNZ: Gold |
| Young Manhood and Other Donatable Organs | Released: October 16, 2026; Label: Belting Bronco, Warner; Formats: Digital download, streaming, vinyl, CD | 2 | 1 | 1 | 1 | 4 | 1 | 3 | 6 | 6 | 11 | |
"—" denotes a recording that did not chart in that territory.

== Singles ==
=== As lead artist ===
List of singles as lead artist, with selected chart positions and certifications, showing year released and album name
| Title | Year | Peak chart positions | | | | | | | | | | Certifications | Album |
| Title | Year | US | US Rock | US Country | US Country Airplay | AUS | CAN | IRE | NZ | UK | WW | Certifications | Album |
|---|---|---|---|---|---|---|---|---|---|---|---|---|---|
| "Heading South" | 2019 | — | 27 | — | — | — | — | 44 | — | — | — | RIAA: 6× Platinum; ARIA: 2× Platinum; BPI: Platinum; MC: 9× Platinum; RMNZ: 3× Platinum | Elisabeth |
| "Oklahoma City" | 2020 | — | 34 | — | — | — | — | — | — | — | — | RIAA: Gold; MC: Gold | American Heartbreak |
| "From Austin" | 2022 | — (Note: "From Austin" did not enter the Billboard Hot 100, but peaked at number four on the Bubbling Under Hot 100 chart.) | 9 | 28 | — | — | — | — | — | — | — | RIAA: 2× Platinum; MC: 3× Platinum; RMNZ: Gold | American Heartbreak |
| "Highway Boys" | 2022 | — | 21 | 40 | — | — | — | — | — | — | — | RIAA: Platinum; MC: Platinum | American Heartbreak |
| "Late July" | 2022 | — | — | 42 | — | — | — | — | — | — | — | RIAA: Gold; MC: Gold | American Heartbreak |
| "Something in the Orange" | 2022 | 10 | 1 | 1 | 20 | 6 | 14 | 7 | 9 | 70 | 23 | RIAA: 16× Platinum; ARIA: 8× Platinum; BPI: 2× Platinum; MC: Diamond; RMNZ: 8× Platinum | American Heartbreak |
| "Open the Gate" | 2022 | — | — | 48 | — | — | — | 22 | — | — | — | RIAA: Platinum; MC: 2× Platinum; RMNZ: Gold | American Heartbreak |
| "Burn, Burn, Burn" | 2022 | 93 | 12 | 24 | — | — | 74 | — | — | — | — | RIAA: 5× Platinum; ARIA: Platinum; BPI: Gold; MC: 6× Platinum; RMNZ: Platinum | Non-album singles |
| "Starved" | 2022 | — | 27 | 47 | — | — | — | — | — | — | — | | Non-album singles |
| "Dawns" (featuring Maggie Rogers) | 2023 | 42 | 4 | 11 | — | 64 | 47 | 36 | — | — | 99 | RIAA: 3× Platinum; ARIA: Gold; BPI: Gold; MC: 5× Platinum; RMNZ: Platinum | Non-album singles |
| "I Remember Everything" (featuring Kacey Musgraves) | 2023 | 1 | 1 | 1 | 26 | 6 | 2 | 5 | 10 | 14 | 4 | RIAA: 11× Platinum; ARIA: Platinum; BPI: 2× Platinum; MC: Diamond; RMNZ: 5× Platinum | Zach Bryan |
| "Pink Skies" | 2024 | 6 | 1 | 3 | — | 12 | 7 | 7 | 18 | 25 | 16 | RIAA: 6× Platinum; ARIA: 5× Platinum; BPI: Platinum; MC: 9× Platinum; RMNZ: 3× Platinum | The Great American Bar Scene |
| "This World's a Giant" | 2024 | 49 | 9 | 12 | — | — | 41 | 32 | — (Note: "This World's a Giant" did not enter the NZ Top 40 Singles Chart, but peaked at number three on the NZ Hot Singles Chart.) | 73 | 160 | MC: Gold | Non-album singles |
| "High Road" | 2024 | 29 | 6 | 6 | — | — | 28 | 29 | — (Note: "High Road" did not enter the NZ Top 40 Singles Chart, but peaked at number two on the NZ Hot Singles Chart.) | 66 | 74 | RIAA: Platinum; MC: Platinum | Non-album singles |
| "Blue Jean Baby" | 2025 | 73 | 10 | 18 | — | — | 52 | — | — (Note: "Blue Jean Baby" did not enter the NZ Top 40 Singles Chart, but peaked at number 16 on the NZ Hot Singles Chart.) | — | — | RIAA: Gold; MC: Platinum | Non-album singles |
| "Rattlesnake" (with Jack Van Cleaf) | 2025 | — | 18 | 41 | — | — | — | — | — (Note: "Rattlesnake" did not enter the NZ Top 40 Singles Chart, but peaked at number 19 on the NZ Hot Singles Chart.) | — | — | | Non-album singles |
| "Dear Miss" | 2025 | — (Note: "Dear Miss" did not enter the Billboard Hot 100, but peaked at number 3 on the Bubbling Under Hot 100 chart.) | 12 | 21 | — | — | 81 | — | — | — | — | MC: Gold | Non-album singles |
| "Memphis; the Blues" (featuring J.R. Carroll) | 2025 | — | — | — | — | — | — | — | — | — | — | | Non-album singles |
| "Streets of London" | 2025 | — (Note: "Streets of London" did not enter the Billboard Hot 100, but peaked at number 22 on the Bubbling Under Hot 100 chart.) | 21 | — | — | — | 80 | — | — (Note: "Streets of London" did not enter the NZ Top 40 Singles Chart, but peaked at number 23 on the NZ Hot Singles Chart.) | — | — | | Non-album singles |
| "River Washed Hair" | 2025 | 53 | 8 | 15 | — | — | 60 | — | — (Note: "River Washed Hair" did not enter the NZ Top 40 Singles Chart, but peaked at number 11 on the NZ Hot Singles Chart.) | — | 195 | RIAA: Gold; MC: Gold | Non-album singles |
| "A Song for You" | 2025 | — | 20 | — | — | — | — | — | — (Note: "A Song for You" did not enter the NZ Top 40 Singles Chart, but peaked at number 35 on the NZ Hot Singles Chart.) | — | — | | Non-album singles |
| "Madeline" (featuring Gabriella Rose) | 2025 | 62 | 10 | 15 | — | — | 56 | 26 | — (Note: "Madeline" did not enter the NZ Top 40 Singles Chart, but peaked at number 12 on the NZ Hot Singles Chart.) | — | — | RIAA: Gold; MC: Gold | Non-album singles |
| "Bowery" (featuring Kings of Leon) | 2025 | 81 | 9 | 22 | — | — | 54 | 29 | — (Note: "Bowery" did not enter the NZ Top 40 Singles Chart, but peaked at number 5 on the NZ Hot Singles Chart.) | 89 | — | | Non-album singles |
| "Plastic Cigarette" | 2026 | 13 | 3 | 2 | — | 43 | 11 | 5 | — (Note: "Plastic Cigarette" did not enter the NZ Top 40 Singles Chart, but peaked at number 3 on the NZ Hot Singles Chart.) | 29 | 49 | RIAA: Gold; MC: Platinum | With Heaven on Top |
| "Say Why" | 2026 | 25 | 4 | 7 | — | — | 18 | 7 | — (Note: "Say Why" did not enter the NZ Top 40 Singles Chart, but peaked at number 6 on the NZ Hot Singles Chart.) | 43 | 127 | RIAA: Gold; MC: Platinum | With Heaven on Top |
| "Lies" (featuring Lana Del Rey) | 2026 | 4 | 2 | 2 | — | 8 | 4 | 3 | 17 | 7 | 5 | | Young Manhood and Other Donatable Organs |
"—" denotes a recording that did not chart in that territory.

=== As featured artist ===
List of singles as featured artist, showing year released and album name
| Title | Year | Peak chart positions | | | | | Album |
| Title | Year | US Rock | CAN | IRE | NZ Hot | UK Sales | Album |
|---|---|---|---|---|---|---|---|
| "We're Onto Something" (Kings of Leon featuring Zach Bryan) | 2025 | 25 | 98 | 56 | 12 | 85 | Non-album single |

=== Promotional singles ===
List of promotional singles, with selected chart positions and certifications, showing year released and album name
| Title | Year | Peak chart positions | | | | Certifications | Album |
| Title | Year | US | US Country | CAN | NZ Hot | Certifications | Album |
|---|---|---|---|---|---|---|---|
| "Purple Gas" (with Noeline Hofmann) | 2024 | 69 | 19 | 51 | 17 | RIAA: Gold; MC: Platinum | The Great American Bar Scene |

== Other charted and certified songs ==
List of other charted songs, with selected chart positions and certifications, showing year released and album name
| Title | Year | Peak chart positions | | | | | | | | | Certifications | Album |
| Title | Year | US | US Country | US Rock | AUS | CAN | IRE | NZ Hot | UK | WW | Certifications | Album |
|---|---|---|---|---|---|---|---|---|---|---|---|---|
| "Flying or Crying" | 2019 | — | — | — | — | — | — | — | — | — | RIAA: Gold; MC: Gold | DeAnn |
| "God Speed" | 2019 | — | — | — | — | — | — | — | — | — | RIAA: Platinum; MC: Platinum | DeAnn |
| "Don't Give Up On Me" | 2019 | — | — | — | — | — | — | — | — | — | RIAA: Gold; MC: Gold | DeAnn |
| "Letting Someone Go" | 2019 | — | — | — | — | — | — | — | — | — | RIAA: Platinum; MC: Platinum | DeAnn |
| "Snow" | 2019 | — | — | — | — | — | — | — | — | — | RIAA: Platinum; MC: Platinum | DeAnn |
| "Condemned" | 2019 | — | — | — | — | — | — | — | — | — | RIAA: 2× Platinum; MC: 2× Platinum; RMNZ: Gold | DeAnn |
| "Come As You Are" | 2020 | — | — | — | — | — | — | — | — | — | RIAA: Gold | Elisabeth |
| "From a Lover's Point of View" | 2020 | — | — | — | — | — | — | — | — | — | RIAA: Gold; MC: Gold | Elisabeth |
| "Leaving" | 2020 | — | — | — | — | — | — | — | — | — | RIAA: Gold; MC: Gold | Elisabeth |
| "Loom" | 2020 | — | — | — | — | — | — | — | — | — | RIAA: Gold; MC: Gold | Elisabeth |
| "Let You Down" | 2020 | — | — | — | — | — | — | — | — | — | RIAA: Platinum; MC: Platinum | Quiet, Heavy Dreams |
| "Crooked Teeth" | 2020 | — | — | — | — | — | — | — | — | — | RIAA: Platinum; MC: Platinum | Quiet, Heavy Dreams |
| "November Air" | 2020 | — | — | — | — | — | — | — | — | — | RIAA: Platinum; MC: Platinum | Quiet, Heavy Dreams |
| "Birmingham" | 2020 | — | — | — | — | — | — | — | — | — | RIAA: Gold; MC: Gold | Quiet, Heavy Dreams |
| "Traveling Man" | 2020 | — | — | — | — | — | — | — | — | — | RIAA: Platinum; MC: Platinum | Quiet, Heavy Dreams |
| "Heavy Eyes" | 2022 | — (Note: "Heavy Eyes" did not enter the Billboard Hot 100, but peaked at number 19 on the Bubbling Under Hot 100 chart.) | 28 | 12 | — | — | — | — | — | — | RIAA: Platinum; ARIA: Gold; MC: 2× Platinum | American Heartbreak |
| "Mine Again" | 2022 | — | 39 | 18 | — | — | — | — | — | — | RIAA: Gold; MC: Platinum | American Heartbreak |
| "Happy Instead" | 2022 | — | 47 | 19 | — | — | — | — | — | — | RIAA: Gold | American Heartbreak |
| "Right Now the Best" | 2022 | — | — | 25 | — | — | — | — | — | — | | American Heartbreak |
| "The Outskirts" | 2022 | — | — | 27 | — | — | — | — | — | — | | American Heartbreak |
| "Younger Years" | 2022 | — | — | 31 | — | — | — | — | — | — | | American Heartbreak |
| "Cold Damn Vampires" | 2022 | — | — | 23 | — | — | — | — | — | — | RIAA: Gold; MC: Gold | American Heartbreak |
| "Tishomingo" | 2022 | — | — | 26 | — | — | — | — | — | — | RIAA: Platinum; MC: Platinum | American Heartbreak |
| "She's Alright" | 2022 | — | — | 24 | — | — | — | — | — | — | RIAA: Gold; MC: Gold | American Heartbreak |
| "Darling" | 2022 | — | — | 38 | — | — | — | — | — | — | | American Heartbreak |
| "Ninth Cloud" | 2022 | — | — | 42 | — | — | — | — | — | — | | American Heartbreak |
| "Sun to Me" | 2022 | — (Note: "Sun to Me" did not enter the Billboard Hot 100, but peaked at number three on the Bubbling Under Hot 100 chart.) | 32 | 29 | — | 71 | 63 | — | — | — | RIAA: 4× Platinum; BPI: Silver; MC: 6× Platinum; RMNZ: Platinum | American Heartbreak |
| "Billy Stay" | 2022 | — | — | 44 | — | — | — | — | — | — | | American Heartbreak |
| "Sober Side of Sorry" | 2022 | — | — | 43 | — | — | — | — | — | — | | American Heartbreak |
| "The Good I'll Do" | 2022 | — | 35 | 21 | — | — | — | — | — | — | RIAA: 2× Platinum; ARIA: Gold; MC: 3× Platinum; RMNZ: Gold | American Heartbreak |
| "Someday (Maggie's)" | 2022 | — | — | — | — | — | — | — | — | — | RIAA: Gold; MC: Gold | American Heartbreak |
| "Poems and Closing Time" | 2022 | — | — | 33 | — | — | — | — | — | — | RIAA: Gold; MC: Gold | American Heartbreak |
| "If She Wants a Cowboy" | 2022 | — | — | — | — | — | — | — | — | — | RIAA: Gold; MC: Gold | American Heartbreak |
| "Corinthians (Proctor's)" | 2022 | — | — | 45 | — | — | — | — | — | — | | American Heartbreak |
| "Half Grown" | 2022 | — | — | 48 | — | — | — | — | — | — | | American Heartbreak |
| "No Cure" | 2022 | — | — | 47 | — | — | — | — | — | — | | American Heartbreak |
| "'68 Fastback" | 2022 | — | — | — | — | — | — | — | — | — | RIAA: Gold; MC: Gold | American Heartbreak |
| "Blue" | 2022 | — | — | 39 | — | — | — | — | — | — | RIAA: Gold; MC: Gold | American Heartbreak |
| "Quittin' Time" | 2022 | — | — | — | — | — | — | — | — | — | RIAA: Platinum; MC: Platinum | Summertime Blues |
| "Motorcycle Drive By" | 2022 | — | — | 24 | — | 100 | — | — | — | — | RIAA: 2× Platinum; BPI: Silver; MC: 3× Platinum; RMNZ: Platinum | Summertime Blues |
| "Summertime Blues" | 2022 | — | — | 26 | — | — | — | — | — | — | RIAA: Gold | Summertime Blues |
| "Oklahoma Smokeshow" | 2022 | 72 | 24 | 10 | — | 66 | 4 | — | — | — | RIAA: 6× Platinum; BPI: Gold; MC: 7× Platinum; RMNZ: Platinum | Summertime Blues |
| "Jamie" (featuring Charles Wesley Godwin) | 2022 | — | — | — | — | — | — | — | — | — | RIAA: Gold; MC: Gold | Summertime Blues |
| "Twenty So" | 2022 | — | — | 41 | — | — | — | — | — | — | | Summertime Blues |
| "Us Then" | 2022 | — | — | — | — | — | — | — | — | — | MC: Gold | Summertime Blues |
| "Matt and Audie" | 2022 | — | — | 50 | — | — | — | — | — | — | | Summertime Blues |
| "All the Time" | 2022 | — | — | 32 | — | — | — | — | — | — | RIAA: Gold; MC: Platinum | Summertime Blues |
| "Starved" | 2022 | — | 47 | 27 | — | — | — | — | — | — | | Non-album singles |
| "Fifth of May" | 2022 | — (Note: "Fifth of May" did not enter the Billboard Hot 100, but peaked at number 13 on the Bubbling Under Hot 100 chart.) | 30 | 18 | — | — | — | — | — | — | RIAA: 2× Platinum; MC: 2× Platinum | Non-album singles |
| "The Greatest Day of My Life" | 2022 | — | 43 | 27 | — | — | — | — | — | — | RIAA: Gold; MC: Gold | Non-album singles |
| "Revival" | 2023 | — (Note: "Revival" did not enter the Billboard Hot 100, but peaked at number one on the Bubbling Under Hot 100 chart.) | — | 9 | — | 66 | 2 | — | 88 | — | RIAA: 3× Platinum; BPI: Silver; MC: 5× Platinum; RMNZ: Platinum | Elisabeth |
| "Fear and Friday's (Poem)" | 2023 | 39 | 19 | 16 | — | 39 | — | — | — | 103 | MC: 2× Platinum | Zach Bryan |
| "Overtime" | 2023 | 22 | 10 | 6 | 100 | 24 | — | — | — | 54 | RIAA: Platinum; MC: Platinum | Zach Bryan |
| "Summertime's Close" | 2023 | 23 | 11 | 7 | — | 27 | — | — | — | 55 | RIAA: Platinum | Zach Bryan |
| "East Side of Sorrow" | 2023 | 18 | 7 | 4 | 74 | 18 | — | 5 | — | 44 | RIAA: 2× Platinum; BPI: Silver; MC: 3× Platinum; RMNZ: Gold | Zach Bryan |
| "Hey Driver" (featuring the War and Treaty) | 2023 | 14 | 5 | 2 | 41 | 14 | 29 | 4 | — | 33 | RIAA: 3× Platinum; ARIA: Platinum; BPI: Silver; MC: 5× Platinum; RMNZ: Platinum | Zach Bryan |
| "Fear and Friday's" | 2023 | 24 | 12 | 8 | 96 | 23 | — | — | — | 59 | RIAA: Platinum; MC: 2× Platinum | Zach Bryan |
| "Ticking" | 2023 | 29 | 14 | 10 | — | 29 | — | — | — | 67 | RIAA: Gold; MC: Platinum | Zach Bryan |
| "Holy Roller" (featuring Sierra Ferrell) | 2023 | 37 | 17 | 14 | — | 36 | — | — | — | 85 | RIAA: Gold; MC: Platinum | Zach Bryan |
| "Jake's Piano – Long Island" | 2023 | 41 | 21 | 17 | — | 42 | — | — | — | 109 | RIAA: Gold; MC: Gold | Zach Bryan |
| "El Dorado" | 2023 | 31 | 15 | 12 | — | 35 | — | — | — | 79 | RIAA: Platinum; MC: Platinum | Zach Bryan |
| "Tourniquet" | 2023 | 20 | 8 | 5 | — | 22 | — | — | — | 47 | RIAA: 2× Platinum; ARIA: Gold; BPI: Silver; MC: 3× Platinum; RMNZ: Gold | Zach Bryan |
| "Spotless" (featuring the Lumineers) | 2023 | 17 | 6 | 3 | 79 | 15 | 28 | 6 | — | 39 | RIAA: 2× Platinum; BPI: Silver; MC: 4× Platinum; RMNZ: Platinum | Zach Bryan |
| "Tradesman" | 2023 | 44 | 22 | 19 | — | 38 | — | — | — | 111 | RIAA: Gold; MC: Gold | Zach Bryan |
| "Smaller Acts" | 2023 | 38 | 18 | 15 | — | 34 | — | — | — | 94 | RIAA: Platinum; MC: Platinum | Zach Bryan |
| "Oklahoman Son" | 2023 | 47 | 25 | 20 | — | 46 | — | — | — | 134 | RIAA: Gold; MC: Gold | Zach Bryan |
| "Nine Ball" | 2023 | 54 | 15 | 11 | — | 43 | 1 | 15 | 86 | — | RIAA: 2× Platinum; BPI: Silver; MC: 4× Platinum; RMNZ: Platinum | Boys of Faith |
| "Sarah's Place" (featuring Noah Kahan) | 2023 | 14 | 5 | 2 | — | 13 | 28 | 5 | — | 41 | RIAA: 2× Platinum; BPI: Silver; MC: 3× Platinum; RMNZ: Gold | Boys of Faith |
| "Boys of Faith" (featuring Bon Iver) | 2023 | 26 | 9 | 5 | — | 24 | — | 7 | — | 84 | RIAA: Platinum; MC: Platinum | Boys of Faith |
| "Deep Satin" | 2023 | 45 | 12 | — | — | 40 | — | 14 | — | 149 | RIAA: Gold; MC: Platinum | Boys of Faith |
| "Pain, Sweet, Pain" | 2023 | 66 | 18 | — | — | 59 | — | — | — | — | | Boys of Faith |
| "Lucky Enough (Poem)" | 2024 | — (Note: "Lucky Enough (Poem)" did not enter the Billboard Hot 100, but peaked at number two on the Bubbling Under Hot 100 chart.) | 43 | 27 | — | — | — | — | — | — | | The Great American Bar Scene |
| "Mechanical Bull" | 2024 | 73 | 27 | 18 | — | 72 | — | — | — | — | | The Great American Bar Scene |
| "The Great American Bar Scene" | 2024 | 58 | 23 | 13 | — | 60 | — | — | — | — | MC: Gold | The Great American Bar Scene |
| "28" | 2024 | 14 | 5 | 4 | 41 | 18 | 17 | 3 | 73 | 25 | RIAA: 3× Platinum; ARIA: 2× Platinum; BPI: Silver; MC: 4× Platinum; RMNZ: Platinum | The Great American Bar Scene |
| "American Nights" | 2024 | 21 | 8 | 5 | — | 36 | — | 9 | — | 71 | RIAA: Platinum; MC: 2× Platinum | The Great American Bar Scene |
| "Oak Island" | 2024 | 48 | 18 | 10 | — | 48 | — | 10 | — | 173 | RIAA: Gold; MC: Gold | The Great American Bar Scene |
| "Boons" | 2024 | 74 | 28 | 19 | — | 73 | — | — | — | — | MC: Gold | The Great American Bar Scene |
| "The Way Back" | 2024 | 57 | 22 | 12 | — | 61 | — | — | — | — | RIAA: Gold; MC: Platinum | The Great American Bar Scene |
| "Memphis; the Blues" (featuring John Moreland) | 2024 | 83 | 31 | 21 | — | 78 | — | — | — | — | | The Great American Bar Scene |
| "Like Ida" | 2024 | 91 | 37 | 23 | — | 87 | — | — | — | — | | The Great American Bar Scene |
| "Bass Boat" | 2024 | 61 | 24 | 14 | — | 62 | — | — | — | — | RIAA: Gold; MC: Platinum | The Great American Bar Scene |
| "Better Days" (featuring John Mayer) | 2024 | 46 | 17 | 8 | — | 49 | — | 7 | — | 147 | RIAA: Gold; MC: Platinum | The Great American Bar Scene |
| "Towers" | 2024 | 94 | 39 | 24 | — | 95 | — | — | — | — | | The Great American Bar Scene |
| "Sandpaper" (featuring Bruce Springsteen) | 2024 | 71 | 26 | 17 | — | 63 | — | — | — | — | RIAA: Gold; MC: Platinum | The Great American Bar Scene |
| "Northern Thunder" | 2024 | 93 | 38 | — | — | 89 | — | — | — | — | | The Great American Bar Scene |
| "Funny Man" | 2024 | 99 | 41 | 26 | — | 99 | — | — | — | — | | The Great American Bar Scene |
| "Bathwater" | 2024 | — (Note: "Bathwater" did not enter the Billboard Hot 100, but peaked at number four on the Bubbling Under Hot 100 chart.) | 45 | 29 | — | — | — | — | — | | | The Great American Bar Scene |
| "Down, Down, Stream" | 2026 | — (Note: "Down, Down, Stream" did not enter the Billboard Hot 100, but peaked at number 15 on the Bubbling Under Hot 100 chart.) | — | — | — | 98 | — | — | — | — | | With Heaven on Top |
| "Runny Eggs" | 2026 | 46 | 18 | 10 | — | 30 | — | — | — | — | | With Heaven on Top |
| "Appetite" | 2026 | 38 | 14 | 8 | — | 25 | 13 | 7 | 48 | — | | With Heaven on Top |
| "DeAnn's Denim" | 2026 | 56 | 24 | 13 | — | 40 | — | — | — | — | | With Heaven on Top |
| "Drowning" | 2026 | 57 | 25 | 14 | — | 41 | — | — | — | — | | With Heaven on Top |
| "Santa Fe" | 2026 | 61 | 28 | 17 | — | 42 | — | — | — | — | | With Heaven on Top |
| "Skin" | 2026 | 51 | 21 | 11 | — | 32 | — | — | — | — | | With Heaven on Top |
| "Dry Deserts" | 2026 | 58 | 26 | 16 | — | 33 | — | — | — | — | | With Heaven on Top |
| "Bad News" | 2026 | 35 | 12 | 7 | — | 27 | — | 8 | — | — | | With Heaven on Top |
| "South and Pine" | 2026 | 69 | 31 | 20 | — | 52 | — | — | — | — | | With Heaven on Top |
| "Cannonball" | 2026 | 71 | 33 | 21 | — | 51 | — | — | — | — | | With Heaven on Top |
| "Slicked Back" | 2026 | 72 | 34 | 21 | — | 50 | — | — | — | — | | With Heaven on Top |
| "Anyways" | 2026 | 73 | 35 | 23 | — | 48 | — | — | — | — | | With Heaven on Top |
| "If They Come Lookin'" | 2026 | 87 | 38 | 26 | — | 65 | — | — | — | — | | With Heaven on Top |
| "Rivers and Creeks" | 2026 | 89 | 39 | 27 | — | 60 | — | — | — | — | | With Heaven on Top |
| "You Can Still Come Home" | 2026 | 95 | 40 | 28 | — | 62 | — | — | — | — | | With Heaven on Top |
| "Aeroplane" | 2026 | — (Note: "Aeroplane" did not enter the Billboard Hot 100, but peaked at number 1 on the Bubbling Under Hot 100 chart.) | 41 | 29 | — | 69 | — | — | — | — | | With Heaven on Top |
| "Always Willin'" | 2026 | — (Note: "Always Willin'" did not enter the Billboard Hot 100, but peaked at number 5 on the Bubbling Under Hot 100 chart.) | 44 | 31 | — | 74 | — | — | — | — | | With Heaven on Top |
| "Miles" | 2026 | — (Note: "Miles" did not enter the Billboard Hot 100, but peaked at number 7 on the Bubbling Under Hot 100 chart.) | 46 | 33 | — | 77 | — | — | — | — | | With Heaven on Top |
| "All Good Things Past" | 2026 | — (Note: "All Good Things Past" did not enter the Billboard Hot 100, but peaked at number 10 on the Bubbling Under Hot 100 chart.) | 48 | 34 | — | 82 | — | — | — | — | | With Heaven on Top |
| "Camper" | 2026 | — (Note: "Camper" did not enter the Billboard Hot 100, but peaked at number 23 on the Bubbling Under Hot 100 chart.) | — | 36 | — | 93 | — | — | — | — | | With Heaven on Top |
| "Sundown Girls" | 2026 | — (Note: "Sundown Girls" did not enter the Billboard Hot 100, but peaked at number 22 on the Bubbling Under Hot 100 chart.) | 50 | 35 | — | 95 | — | — | — | — | | With Heaven on Top |
| "With Heaven on Top" | 2026 | 68 | 30 | 15 | — | 55 | — | — | — | — | | With Heaven on Top |
| "Lodi When" | 2026 | 22 | 9 | 6 | 38 | 11 | 8 | 4 | 33 | 55 | | Young Manhood and Other Donatable Organs |
| "Robot Killed the Working Man" | 2026 | 35 | 12 | 10 | 74 | 17 | 15 | 7 | 46 | 147 | | Young Manhood and Other Donatable Organs |
| "Dog Days" | 2026 | 53 | 20 | 17 | 92 | 29 | — | — | — | — | | Young Manhood and Other Donatable Organs |
| "Backwards" | 2026 | 50 | 17 | 15 | 89 | 27 | — | — | — | — | | Young Manhood and Other Donatable Organs |
| "Plainsman" (featuring Turnpike Troubadours) | 2026 | 45 | 14 | 14 | 87 | 24 | — | 9 | — | — | | Young Manhood and Other Donatable Organs |
| "Is the Blue Tangled in You?" | 2026 | 60 | 23 | 21 | — | 39 | — | — | — | — | | Young Manhood and Other Donatable Organs |
| "You'll Get By" | 2026 | 51 | 18 | 16 | 100 | 31 | — | — | — | — | | Young Manhood and Other Donatable Organs |
"—" denotes a recording that did not chart in that territory.
