= With Heaven on Tour =

2026 concert tour by Zach Bryan

- Tour by Zach Bryan
- Promotional poster
- Location: North America; Europe
- Associated album: With Heaven on Top
- Start date: March 7, 2026
- End date: October 10, 2026
- No. of shows: 39
- Supporting acts: Kings of Leon; Dijon; Alabama Shakes; Ben Howard; Caamp; MJ Lenderman; Gregory Alan Isakov; Trampled by Turtles; J.R. Carroll; Gabriella Rose; Keenan O'Meara; Fey Fili

Zach Bryan concert chronology
- The Quittin' Time Tour (2024–2025); With Heaven on Tour (2026); The Young Manhood and Other Donatable Organs Tour (2027)

With Heaven on Tour is the fourth concert tour by American singer-songwriter Zach Bryan, in support of his sixth album, With Heaven on Top. The tour began on March 7, 2026, in St. Louis, Missouri and concluded on October 10, 2026, in Auburn, Alabama.

== Background ==
In July 2024, Bryan released his fifth studio album, The Great American Bar Scene, which peaked at Number 2 on the Billboard 200. Following its release, he released a number of standalone singles, such as "High Road", "River Washed Hair", and "Bowery", a collaboration with American rock band Kings of Leon. Bryan headlined several major shows throughout 2025, with appearances at festivals BST Hyde Park and Stagecoach Festival, as well as venues including Phoenix Park, MetLife Stadium, and Golden Gate Park. In September, he became the first artist to headline a concert at Michigan Stadium, the largest stadium in the United States, and in doing so, set a new record for the largest ticketed concert in US history.

On July 18, 2025, Bryan confirmed the release date for his upcoming album, With Heaven on Top, as January 9, 2026. On November 24, 2025, Bryan announced a 34-date tour in support of the album, visiting a total of 27 cities across the United States and Europe. On December 4, he announced an additional five shows in North America in response to high demand, bringing the total number of shows to 39.

== Setlist ==
This setlist was taken from the show in Charlotte on April 18, 2026. It does not represent all shows throughout the tour.

1. "Overtime"
2. "Open the Gate"
3. "Appetite"
4. "Something in the Orange"
5. "God Speed"
6. "Say Why"
7. "Dawns"
8. "Nine Ball"
9. "Hey Driver"
10. "American Nights"
11. "Oklahoma Smokeshow"
12. "You'll Get By"
13. "Santa Fe"
14. "Pink Skies"
15. "Don't Give Up on Me"
16. "Heavy Eyes"
17. "Burn, Burn, Burn"
18. "Bad News"
19. "East Side of Sorrow"
20. "Motorcycle Drive By"
21. "Skin"
22. "Heading South"
23. "Fifth of May"
24. "Slicked Back"
25. "I Remember Everything"
26. "Lawyers, Guns and Money"
27. "Revival"

== Tour dates ==
List of 2026 concerts
Date (2026)	City	Country	Venue	Opening act(s)	Attendance	Revenue
March 7	St. Louis	United States	The Dome at America's Center	Caamp; J.R. Carroll	—	—
March 14	Tampa	United States	Raymond James Stadium	Caamp; J.R. Carroll	—	—
March 21	San Antonio	United States	Alamodome	Caamp; J.R. Carroll	—	—
March 28	Baton Rouge	United States	Tiger Stadium	Caamp; J.R. Carroll	—	—
April 4	Tulsa	United States	H.A. Chapman Stadium	Trampled by Turtles; J.R. Carroll	—	—
April 11	Louisville	United States	L&N Federal Credit Union Stadium	Kings of Leon; J.R. Carroll	—	—
April 18	Charlotte	United States	Bank of America Stadium	Caamp; J.R. Carroll	—	—
April 25	Lincoln	United States	Memorial Stadium	Kings of Leon; J.R. Carroll	—	—
May 2	Starkville	United States	Davis Wade Stadium	Dijon; J.R. Carroll	—	—
May 9	Cleveland	United States	Huntington Bank Field	Dijon; J.R. Carroll	—	—
May 27	San Sebastián	Spain	Donostia Arena	Ben Howard; Keenan O'Meara	—	—
May 31	Berlin	Germany	Waldbühne	Ben Howard; Keenan O'Meara	—	—
June 3	Oslo	Norway	Unity Arena	Ben Howard; Keenan O'Meara	—	—
June 6	Copenhagen	Denmark	Parken Stadium	Ben Howard; Keenan O'Meara	—	—
June 9	Eindhoven	Netherlands	Philips Stadion	Ben Howard; Keenan O'Meara	—	—
June 12	Liverpool	England	Anfield	Dijon; Fey Fili	—	—
June 14	Edinburgh	Scotland	Murrayfield Stadium	Dijon; Fey Fili	—	—
June 16	London	England	Tottenham Hotspur Stadium	Dijon; Fey Fili	—	—
June 17	London	England	Tottenham Hotspur Stadium	Dijon; Fey Fili	—	—
June 20	Cork	Ireland	Páirc Uí Chaoimh	Dijon; Fey Fili	—	—
June 21	Cork	Ireland	Páirc Uí Chaoimh	Dijon; Fey Fili	—	—
June 23	Belfast	Northern Ireland	Boucher Playing Fields	Dijon; Fey Fili	—	—
June 24	Belfast	Northern Ireland	Boucher Playing Fields	Dijon; Fey Fili	—	—
July 25	Eugene	United States	Autzen Stadium	Alabama Shakes; Fey Fili	—	—
July 31	San Diego	United States	Snapdragon Stadium	MJ Lenderman; Fey Fili	—	—
August 1	San Diego	United States	Snapdragon Stadium	MJ Lenderman; Fey Fili	—	—
August 7	Salt Lake City	United States	Rice-Eccles Stadium	MJ Lenderman; Fey Fili	—	—
August 13	Denver	United States	Empower Field at Mile High	MJ Lenderman; Fey Fili	—	—
August 14	Denver	United States	Empower Field at Mile High	MJ Lenderman; Fey Fili	—	—
August 22	Arlington	United States	AT&T Stadium	MJ Lenderman; Fey Fili	—	—
September 5	Glendale	United States	State Farm Stadium	MJ Lenderman; Fey Fili	—	—
September 18	Dover	United States	The Woodlands	Kings of Leon; Fey Fili; Gabriella Rose	—	—
September 19	Dover	United States	The Woodlands	Alabama Shakes; Fey Fili; Gabriella Rose	—	—
September 21	Toronto	Canada	Rogers Centre	Trampled by Turtles; Gabriella Rose	—	—
September 22	Toronto	Canada	Rogers Centre	Trampled by Turtles; Gabriella Rose	—	—
October 2	Foxborough	United States	Gillette Stadium	Gregory Alan Isakov; Gabriella Rose	—	—
October 3	Foxborough	United States	Gillette Stadium	Gregory Alan Isakov; Gabriella Rose	—	—
October 10	Auburn	United States	Jordan-Hare Stadium	Gregory Alan Isakov; Gabriella Rose	—	—

=== Cancelled dates ===
List of cancelled concerts
Date (2026)	City	Country	Venue	Reason	Ref.
April 3	Tulsa	United States	H.A. Chapman Stadium	Severe weather threat	
