= Billboard Music Award for Top Streaming Song (Audio) =

Annual American music award

The Billboard Music Award for Top Streaming Song (Audio) winners and nominees.

== Winners and nominees ==
Year	Song	Artist	Nominees
2011	"Just a Dream"	Nelly	"Just the Way You Are" – Bruno Mars "Love the Way You Lie" – Eminem featuring Rihanna "Need You Now" – Lady Antebellum "Dynamite" – Taio Cruz
2012	"Rolling in the Deep"	Adele	"Super Bass" – Nicki Minaj "How to Love" – Lil Wayne "Party Rock Anthem" – LMFAO feat. Lauren Bennett & GoonRock "Without You" – David Guetta feat. Usher
2013	"Somebody That I Used to Know"	Gotye featuring Kimbra	"Some Nights" – Fun. "We Are Young" – Fun. feat. Janelle Monáe "Lights" – Ellie Goulding "Call Me Maybe" – Carly Rae Jepsen
2014	"Radioactive"	Imagine Dragons	"Get Lucky" – Daft Punk feat. Pharrell Williams "Royals" – Lorde "Can't Hold Us" – Macklemore & Ryan Lewis "Blurred Lines" – Robin Thicke feat. T.I. and Pharrell Williams
2015	"All of Me"	John Legend	"Fancy" – Iggy Azalea feat. Charli XCX "Take Me to Church" – Hozier "Stay with Me" – Sam Smith "Habits (Stay High)" – Tove Lo
2016	"The Hills"	The Weeknd	"Sorry" – Justin Bieber "What Do You Mean?" – Justin Bieber "Trap Queen" – Fetty Wap "Hotline Bling" – Drake
2017	"One Dance"	Drake featuring Wizkid and Kyla	"Broccoli" – DRAM featuring Lil Yachty "Closer" – The Chainsmokers featuring Halsey "Needed Me" – Rihanna "Starboy" – The Weeknd featuring Daft Punk
2018	"Humble"	Kendrick Lamar	"Congratulations" – Post Malone featuring Quavo "Despacito" – Luis Fonsi and Daddy Yankee featuring Justin Bieber "Rockstar" – Post Malone featuring 21 Savage "XO Tour Llif3" – Lil Uzi Vert
2019	"Sicko Mode"	Travis Scott featuring Drake, Swae Lee and Big Hawk	"I Like It" – Cardi B with Bad Bunny and J Balvin "Lucid Dreams" – Juice Wrld "Better Now" – Post Malone "Sad!" – XXXTentacion
2020	"Old Town Road"	Lil Nas X featuring Billy Ray Cyrus	"No Guidance" – Chris Brown featuring Drake "Bad Guy" – Billie Eilish "Ransom" – Lil Tecca "Sunflower" – Post Malone and Swae Lee
2021	"Rockstar"	DaBaby featuring Roddy Ricch	"WAP" – Cardi B featuring Megan Thee Stallion "Life Is Good" – Future featuring Drake "Whats Poppin" – Jack Harlow featuring DaBaby, Tory Lanez and Lil Wayne "Blinding Lights" – The Weeknd
2022	"Stay"	The Kid Laroi and Justin Bieber	"Heat Waves" – Glass Animals "Levitating" – Dua Lipa "Good 4 U" – Olivia Rodrigo "Save Your Tears" – The Weeknd and Ariana Grande
2023	"Last Night"	Morgan Wallen	"Something in the Orange" – Zach Bryan "Flowers" – Miley Cyrus "Anti-Hero" – Taylor Swift "Kill Bill" – SZA
2024	"I Remember Everything"	Zach Bryan featuring Kacey Musgraves	"Not Like Us" – Kendrick Lamar "I Had Some Help" – Post Malone featuring Morgan Wallen "A Bar Song (Tipsy)" – Shaboozey "Lose Control" – Teddy Swims

== Multiple wins and nominations ==
=== Wins ===
2 wins

- Drake

=== Nominations ===
5 nominations

- Drake

4 nominations

- Justin Bieber
- Post Malone
- The Weeknd

2 nominations

- Cardi B
- DaBaby
- Fun.
- Lil Wayne
- Pharrell Williams
- Swae Lee
