= Billboard Music Award for Top Rock Song =

Annual American music award

The Billboard Music Award for Top Rock Song winners and nominees. Collective Soul, Panic! at the Disco, and Zach Bryan are the only groups/artists to win twice.

== Winners and nominees ==
Winners are listed first and highlighted in bold.

=== 1990s ===
Year	Song	Artist	Ref.
1992	**"Mysterious Ways"** (Album Rock)	**U2**	
1992	**"One"** (Modern Rock)	**U2**	
1993	**"Plush"**	**Stone Temple Pilots**	
1993	"Are You Gonna Go My Way"	Lenny Kravitz	
1993	"Livin' on the Edge"	Aerosmith	
1993	"Cryin'"	Aerosmith	
1994	**"Shine"**	**Collective Soul**	
1994	"Black Hole Sun	Soundgarden	
1994	"Far Behind"	Candlebox	
1994	"No Excuses"	Alice in Chains	
1995	**"December"**	**Collective Soul**	
1995	"Lightning Crashes"	Live	
1995	"Better Man"	Pearl Jam	
1995	"When I Come Around"	Green Day	
1996	**"Counting Blue Cars"**	**Dishwalla**	
1997	**"If You Could Only See"**	**Tonic**	
1997	"Gone Away"	The Offspring	
1997	"One Headlight"	The Wallflowers	
1997	"Push"	Matchbox Twenty	
1998	**"Blue on Black"**	**Kenny Wayne Shepherd**	
1998	"My Own Prison"	Creed	
1998	"The Down Town"	Days of the New	
1998	"Touch, Peel and Stand"	Days of the New	
1999	**"One"**	**Creed**	
1999	"Heavy"	Collective Soul	
1999	"Scar Tissue"	Red Hot Chili Peppers	
1999	"What It's Like"	Everlast	

=== 2000s ===
Year	Song	Artist	Ref.
2000	**"Kryptonite"**	**3 Doors Down**	
2000	"I Disappear"	Metallica	
2000	"Higher"	Creed	
2000	"No Leaf Clover"	Metallica	
2001	—N/a		
2002	**"Blurry"**	**Puddle of Mudd**	
2002	"I Stand Alone"	Godsmack	
2002	"Wasting My Time"	Default	
2002	"For You"	Staind	
2003	**"Headstrong"**	**Trapt**	
2003	"Seven Nation Army"	The White Stripes	
2003	"Like a Stone"	Audioslave	
2003	"Send the Pain Below"	Chevelle	
2004	—N/a		
2005	**"Boulevard of Broken Dreams"**	**Green Day**	
2005	"Best of You"	Foo Fighters	
2005	"Feel Good Inc."	Gorillaz	
2005	"The Hand That Feeds"	Nine Inch Nails	
2006	**"Animal I Have Become"**	**Three Days Grace**	
2006	"Dani California"	Red Hot Chili Peppers	
2006	"Speak"	Godsmack	
2007-09	—N/a		

=== 2010s ===
Year	Song	Artist	Ref.
2010	—N/a		
2011	**"Hey, Soul Sister"**	**Train**	
2011	"Dog Days Are Over"	Florence and the Machine	
2011	"Little Lion Man"	Mumford & Sons	
2011	"Animal"	Neon Trees	
2011	"Lay Me Down"	The Dirty Heads feat. Rome Ramirez	
2012	**"Pumped Up Kicks"**	**Foster the People**	
2012	"Paradise"	Coldplay	
2012	"Walk"	Foo Fighters	
2012	"Rolling in the Deep"	Adele	
2012	"Someone like You"	Adele	
2013	**"Somebody That I Used to Know"**	**Gotye feat. Kimbra**	
2013	"Some Nights"	Fun	
2013	"We Are Young"	Fun feat. Janelle Monáe	
2013	"Ho Hey"	The Lumineers	
2013	"Home"	Phillip Phillips	
2014	**"Royals"**	**Lorde**	
2014	"Safe and Sound"	Capital Cities	
2014	"Demons"	Imagine Dragons	
2014	"Radioactive"	Imagine Dragons	
2014	Let Her Go"	Passenger	
2015	**"Take Me to Church"**	**Hozier**	
2015	"Pompeii"	Bastille	
2015	"A Sky Full of Stars"	Coldplay	
2015	"Centuries"	Fall Out Boy	
2015	"Ain't It Fun"	Paramore	
2016	**"Shut Up and Dance"**	**Walk the Moon**	
2016	"Uma Thurman"	Fall Out Boy	
2016	"Ex's & Oh's"	Elle King	
2016	"Stressed Out"	Twenty One Pilots	
2016	"Renegades"	X Ambassadors	
2017	**"Heathens"**	**Twenty One Pilots**	
2017	"Ride"	Twenty One Pilots	
2017	"Stressed Out"	Twenty One Pilots	
2017	"Sucker for Pain"	Lil Wayne, Wiz Khalifa and Imagine Dragons with Logic and Ty Dolla Sign featuring X Ambassadors	
2017	"Unsteady"	X Ambassadors	
2018	**"Believer"**	**Imagine Dragons**	
2018	"Thunder"	Imagine Dragons	
2018	"Feel It Still"	Portugal. The Man	
2018	"Heavy"	Linkin Park featuring Kiiara	
2018	"Wish I Knew You"	The Revivalists	
2019	**"High Hopes"**	**Panic! at the Disco**	
2019	"Sit Next to Me"	Foster the People	
2019	"Natural"	Imagine Dragons	
2019	"Whatever It Takes"	Imagine Dragons	
2019	"Broken"	Lovelytheband	

=== 2020s ===
Year	Song	Artist	Ref.
2020	**"Hey Look Ma, I Made It"**	**Panic! at the Disco**	
2020	"Bad Liar"	Imagine Dragons	
2020	"I Think I'm Okay"	Machine Gun Kelly, Yungblud and Travis Barker	
2020	"Chlorine"	Twenty One Pilots	
2020	"The Hype"	Twenty One Pilots	
2021	**"Bang!"**	**AJR**	
2021	"Monsters"	All Time Low featuring Blackbear	
2021	"Heat Waves"	Glass Animals	
2021	"My Ex's Best Friend"	Machine Gun Kelly featuring Blackbear	
2021	"Level of Concern"	Twenty One Pilots	
2022	**"Beggin'"**	**Måneskin**	
2022	"My Universe"	Coldplay and BTS	
2022	"Drunk (And I Don't Wanna Go Home)"	Elle King and Miranda Lambert	
2022	"Follow You"	Imagine Dragons	
2022	"Meet Me at Our Spot"	The Anxiety (Willow Smith and Tyler Cole)	
2023	**"Something in the Orange"**	**Zach Bryan**	
2023	"I Remember Everything"	Zach Bryan featuring Kacey Musgraves	
2023	"Need a Favor"	Jelly Roll	
2023	"Bad Habit"	Steve Lacy	
2023	"Until I Found You"	Stephen Sanchez	
2024	**"I Remember Everything"**	**Zach Bryan featuring Kacey Musgraves**	
2024	"Pink Skies"	Zach Bryan	
2024	"End of Beginning"	Djo	
2024	"Too Sweet"	Hozier	
2024	"Stick Season"	Noah Kahan	

== Superlatives ==
The following individuals received two or more Top Rock Song Awards:

Wins	Artist
2	Zach Bryan
2	Collective Soul
2	Panic! At the Disco

The following individuals received two or more Top Rock Song nominations:

Nominations	Artist
7	Imagine Dragons
6	Twenty One Pilots
4	Zach Bryan
3	Collective Soul
3	Creed
3	Coldplay
2	Adele
2	Aerosmith
2	Days of the New
2	Fall Out Boy
2	Foo Fighters
2	Foster the People
2	Fun
2	Godsmack
2	Green Day
2	Hozier
2	Fun
2	Metallica
2	Red Hot Chili Peppers
