= Bad News (Zach Bryan song) =

Song by Zach Bryan

Song by Zach Bryan

from the album With Heaven on Top
- Released: January 9, 2026
- Length: 3:16
- Label: Belting Bronco; Warner
- Songwriter: Zach Bryan
- Producer: Zach Bryan

"Bad News" is a song by American singer-songwriter Zach Bryan. In early October 2025, Bryan posted a studio snippet to Instagram featuring lyrics that reference immigration raids by U.S. Immigration and Customs Enforcement (ICE), prompting wide coverage and public responses from the U.S. Department of Homeland Security (DHS) and other White House officials. On January 9, 2026, the song appeared on Bryan's sixth studio album, With Heaven on Top.

== Background and announcement ==
On October 3, 2025, Bryan, a U.S. Navy veteran, posted a teaser of an unreleased track on Instagram with the caption "the fading of the red white and blue." Multiple publications reported that the song is called "Bad News," noting lines that reference law enforcement and ICE. In subsequent Instagram stories, Bryan said the full song would provide "context that hits on both sides of the aisle" and emphasized that the song reflected his love for the United States.

== Composition and themes ==
Coverage of the teaser highlighted lyrics describing a raid and social unease, including the line "ICE is gonna come, bust down your door." Pitchfork likewise noted the verse about ICE alongside bars that reference police and broader division.

== Reception (pre-release) ==
The preview sparked immediate national attention, including from the Trump administration. The DHS assistant secretary for public affairs, Tricia McLaughlin, criticized Bryan, stating that Bryan should "stick to 'Pink Skies'", a track from Bryan's album The Great American Bar Scene. The department later shared a video using Bryan's earlier song "Revival," a move widely interpreted as a response to the teaser. Later, a White House spokesperson, Abigail Jackson, issued a statement to Newsweek: "While Zach Bryan wants to Open The Gates to criminal illegal aliens and has Condemned heroic ICE officers, Something in the Orange tells me a majority of Americans disagree with him." US Secretary of Homeland Security Kristi Noem said she was "extremely disappointed and disheartened" by the teaser, adding that she is glad to have never supported his career.

Bryan addressed the reaction in a statement posted to Instagram. He wrote that the song was composed months earlier and that the finished version would provide "the full context that hits on both sides of the aisle." He characterized himself as "just a 29 year old man who is just as confused as everyone else," argued that the response showed "how divisive a narrative can be when shoved down our throats through social media," and added, "Left wing or right wing we're all one bird and American. To be clear I'm on neither of these radical sides."

== Personnel ==
Credits adapted from Tidal Music.

- Ana Monwah Lei – cello
- Austin Stunkard – trumpet
- Andy Mccormick – tenor saxophone
- Colton Jean – engineer
- Gabe Wax – background vocals, engineer
- Hannah Cohen – violin
- Heaven Schmitt – background vocals
- Isaac Washam – trombone
- Jacquire King – mixer
- Jake Weinberg – engineer
- Keenan O'Meara – acoustic guitar, background vocals, piano
- Lucas Ruge-Jones – background vocals, mandolin, violin
- Nate Head – drums
- Noah Legros – electric guitar
- Pete Lyman – mastering
- Ryan Hatcher – trumpet
- Samantha Uzbay – viola
- Scott Zhang – engineer
- William Wethimer – trumpet
- Zach Bryan – producer, writer, electric guitar, lead vocals
- Zephyr Avalon – bass

== Charts ==
Chart performance for "Bad News"
Chart (2026)	Peak position
Canada Hot 100 (Billboard)	27
New Zealand Hot Singles (RMNZ)	8
US Billboard Hot 100	35
US Hot Country Songs (Billboard)	12
US Hot Rock & Alternative Songs (Billboard)	7

== See also ==
- ICE protest song
- "Streets of Minneapolis", 2026 Bruce Springsteen protest song also critical of ICE
