= Runny Eggs =

2026 song by Zach Bryan

Song by Zach Bryan

from the album With Heaven on Top
- Released: January 9, 2026
- Genre: Country
- Length: 3:52
- Label: Belting Broncos; Warner
- Songwriter: Zach Bryan
- Producer: Bryan

"Runny Eggs" is a song by American singer Zach Bryan from his sixth studio album, With Heaven on Top (2026). Prior to its release, he first shared an acoustic rendition of the song in December 2024.

== Composition and lyrics ==
The song opens with a voice note of Zach Bryan participating in the Festival of San Fermín in Pamplona, Spain. It features a sparse acoustic guitar riff throughout, occasionally accompanied by harmonica. In the lyrics, Bryan sings from the perspective of a younger version of himself, as he lists off his personal hopes and ambitions for the future. These include going on a road trip to California, running with the bulls at the aforementioned festival, successful concerts in the snowy Colorado mountains and Brooklyn, and watching his friend break his ankle after drinking too many beers, as well as more simpler moments such as eating "runny eggs", spending time with family and talking to God in church. One particular line finds Bryan looking back on these experiences in the present ("Wish I had known the good times back when I had them"). He concludes the song with the feeling of needing to apologize to God for his behavior, and hopes "Maybe I'll find Jesus when the morning comes".

== Critical reception ==
Matt Mitchell of Paste commented that he was "particularly taken aback" by the song's line "I'll sing the wrong damn song in the wrong damn key / But no matter where I go, I pray to always find home".

== Charts ==
Chart performance for "Runny Eggs"
Chart (2026)	Peak position
Canada Hot 100 (Billboard)	30
US Billboard Hot 100	46
US Hot Country Songs (Billboard)	18
US Hot Rock & Alternative Songs (Billboard)	10
