= Bowery (song) =

2025 single by Zach Bryan featuring Kings of Leon

Single by Zach Bryan featuring Kings of Leon
- Released: August 8, 2025
- Genre: Country; rock
- Length: 3:35
- Label: Belting Bronco; Warner
- Songwriters: Zach Bryan; Caleb Followill; Jared Followill; Matthew Followill; Nathan Followill
- Producer: Bryan

Zach Bryan singles chronology
"Madeline" (2025)	"Bowery" (2025)	"We're Onto Something" (2025)

Kings of Leon singles chronology
"M Television" (2024)	"Bowery" (2025)	"We're Onto Something" (2025)

Music video
- "Bowery" on YouTube

"Bowery" is a single by American singer-songwriter Zach Bryan featuring American rock band Kings of Leon. It was released on August 8, 2025.

== Background ==
In late June 2025, Zach Bryan announced on an Instagram story that "Bowery" would be on his new record, along with "In Dreams", "Madeline", "Plastic Cigarette" and "Rockaway". In July 2025, Kings of Leon opened for Bryan at a few concerts at MetLife Stadium. Bryan previewed a snippet of the song on August 1, 2025.

== Composition and lyrics ==
The song begins with a sparse instrumental with acoustic pattern, over which Zach Bryan quietly counts, before introducing Kings of Leon's trademark guitar tone afterward. It has been described as a hybrid of a folk ballad and rock anthem. Bryan and Caleb Followill sing the opening and second verses respectively, while they join together on the chorus. Lyrically, the narrator recounts meeting a woman at a bar in Bowery, describing her as "sick to her stomach as she sipped gin and tonic" and telling him that she would "rather be dead than sleep alone". He has passion and desires for a connection, but is not ready to fully invest in a relationship, which dissatisfies him. On the chorus, he honestly communicates his feelings to her: "You picked the wrong one / If you're in it for the long run / 'Cause I got the passion / But I don't give it away / But when the time's right / I'm a hell of a good night / I'll make you burn bright / As the heat of the day".

== Critical reception ==
Caitlin Hall of Holler gave a positive review, writing that the instrumental "breathes with subtlety and strength: a classic Zach Bryan acoustic foundation woven with understated strings that intertwine seamlessly with the Kings' signature arena-ready sound. It's a track that feels both personal and larger than life; like a story shared across a crowded bar, amplified on a grand stage." Furthermore, she lauded the artists' performances, remarking "The contrast in deliveries, with Bryan's talk-singing versus Followill's emotive belt, adds texture and complexity without fully blending, making each part stand out while pushing the song's emotional narrative forward." Matthew Strauss of Pitchfork stated "'Bowery' is a great marriage of Bryan's gruff passion and Kings of Leon's reckless abandon. It has the feel of a one-take jam: The Followill boys waste no time launching into the song's loudest and best parts as Bryan sings of familiar themes". He also called the song "an overdue barn-burner from Zach Bryan, someone who's excellent at conjuring big feelings even when he might rather bottle them up."

== Music video ==
The music video was released alongside the single. It sees Zach Bryan and Kings of Leon recording the song in the studio.

== Charts ==
Chart performance for "Bowery"
Chart (2025)	Peak position
Canada Hot 100 (Billboard)	54
Ireland (IRMA)	29
New Zealand Hot Singles (RMNZ)	5
UK Singles (Official Charts)	89
US Billboard Hot 100	81
US Hot Country Songs (Billboard)	22
US Hot Rock & Alternative Songs (Billboard)	9
