= Elisabeth (Zach Bryan album) =

Studio album by Zach Bryan
- Released: May 8, 2020
- Genres: Country; Americana
- Length: 64:15
- Label: Belting Bronco
- Producer: Leo Alba

Zach Bryan chronology
DeAnn (2019)	Elisabeth (2020)	Quiet, Heavy Dreams (2020)

Singles from Elisabeth
- 1. "Heading South" Released: September 30, 2019

Alternate cover
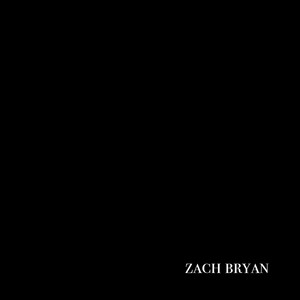
- Bryan updated the artwork on streaming platforms in June 2024

Elisabeth is the second studio album by American singer-songwriter Zach Bryan, released on May 8, 2020, through Belting Bronco. Bryan recorded the album himself using his laptop in a barn behind his house, and its release was preceded by the single "Heading South".

== Critical reception ==
Professional ratings
Review scores
Source	Rating
AllMusic	3/5 stars
Sputnikmusic	4.5/5

Stephen Thomas Erlewine of AllMusic felt that the album "resembles DeAnn in many ways", primarily with its "sparse instrumentation: while Bryan has provided some slight rhythmic textures and colors on the margin, Elisabeth still feels like a solo affair, a record where he's been caught strumming away in his bedroom". Erlewine likened listening to the album is "like eavesdropping on your melancholy neighbor strumming out his soul in the wee hours of the morning". A staff reviewer from Sputnikmusic described Bryan as "the less is more axiom personified, and when it comes to authenticity, he's the real deal", also finding that the album is not "designed to captivate. It's foggy, lo-fi, and predominantly acoustic. There are times when you'll have to fight through the bedroom production to get at the heart of a song [...] but one worth waging for the few who have the patience to endure eighteen straight acoustic Americana ballads".

== Commercial performance ==
Upon release, the album charted on the Heatseekers Albums chart, charting widely in 2023 following the increase in Bryan's profile after his chart successes with his 2022 album American Heartbreak and its accompanying single "Something in the Orange". The album has only ever been released on streaming services and has yet to be issued on physical media.

== Song removal and artwork change ==
In 2022, Bryan removed the songs "Anita, Pt. 2" and "Elisabeth" from streaming services. In June 2024, the artwork was also updated on streaming services to remove the photograph and album name. The album was named after and the artwork featured Bryan's then-wife; the couple divorced in 2021.

== Track listing ==
Elisabeth track listing
No.	Title	Length
1.	"Come as You Are"	4:45
2.	"From a Lover's Point of View"	3:04
3.	"Driving"	3:23
4.	"Heading South"	3:30
5.	"Cold Blooded"	3:25
6.	"Mine"	2:58
7.	"Leaving"	3:27
8.	"Codeine Pills, Pt. 1"	3:16
9.	"Anita, Pt. 2"	3:43
10.	"Hopefully"	3:57
11.	"Messed Up Kid"	4:19
12.	"Loom"	2:43
13.	"Me and Mine"	3:09
14.	"Old Man"	4:01
15.	"A Boy Like You"	4:48
16.	"Elisabeth"	3:19
17.	"Washington Lilacs"	2:47
18.	"Revival"	3:41
Total length:		64:15

== Charts ==
=== Weekly charts ===
Weekly chart performance for Elisabeth
Chart (2022–2026)	Peak position
Canadian Albums (Billboard)	49
Hungarian Physical Albums (MAHASZ)	35
US Billboard 200	76
US Americana/Folk Albums (Billboard)	6
US Top Country Albums (Billboard)	18
US Top Rock Albums (Billboard)	12

=== Year-end charts ===
2023 year-end chart performance for Elisabeth
Chart (2023)	Position
US Top Country Albums (Billboard)	26
US Top Rock Albums (Billboard)	31

2024 year-end chart performance for Elisabeth
Chart (2024)	Position
US Billboard 200	113
US Top Country Albums (Billboard)	24

2025 year-end chart performance for Elisabeth
Chart (2025)	Position
US Top Country Albums (Billboard)	46

== Certifications ==
Certifications for Elisabeth
Region	Certification	Certified units/sales
Canada (Music Canada)	2× Platinum	160,000^{‡}
United States (RIAA)	Platinum	1,000,000^{‡}
^{‡} Sales+streaming figures based on certification alone.
