= 24 (Live) =

Live album by Zach Bryan
- Released: December 20, 2024
- Recorded: March 5 – December 19, 2024
- Genre: Country
- Length: 118:42
- Label: Belting Bronco; Warner

Zach Bryan chronology
The Great American Bar Scene (2024)	24 (Live) (2024)	With Heaven on Top (2026)

24 (Live) is the second live album by American singer-songwriter Zach Bryan, released on December 20, 2024, through Belting Bronco and Warner Records. It was recorded over the stretch of March 5, 2024 to December 19, 2024, during the Quittin’ Time Tour.

== Background ==
On December 19, 2024 Bryan posted to Instagram with the conclusion of the Quittin' Time Tour that he would be releasing a live album from each city on the tour. The album was released at midnight on December 20, 2024.

Bryan originally wanted to create a system to share recordings with his fans, but there were a lot of technical issues. So instead he created a live album where fans who attended a show could at least relive one song. Collaborations on the live album include John Mayer, Maggie Rodgers, The War & Treaty, and Kacey Musgraves. The tour included 25 cities across both the United States and Canada, and each city has one song on the live album. The live album includes songs from each of Zach Bryan's studio albums.

== Track listing ==
24 (Live) track listing
No.	Title	Length
1.	"Overtime – Live From Detroit"	4:36
2.	"Open the Gate - Live From Atlanta"	4:20
3.	"God Speed - Live From San Antonio"	4:25
4.	"The Great American Bar Scene - Live From Philadelphia"	3:30
5.	"Fifth of May - Live From Kansas City"	4:06
6.	"Tishomingo - Live From Little Rock"	3:56
7.	"Oak Island - Live From Dallas"	4:21
8.	"Nine Ball - Live From Vancouver"	3:33
9.	"68 Fast Back - Live From Tulsa"	4:37
10.	"East Side of Sorrow - Live From Nashville"	4:24
11.	"28 - Live From Tampa"	3:40
12.	"Tourniquet - Live From Oakland"	4:13
13.	"Boys of Faith - Live From Edmonton"	3:10
14.	"Better Days (feat. John Mayer) - Live From Los Angeles"	4:22
15.	"Oklahoma Smokeshow - Live From Greensboro"	3:50
16.	"Dawns (feat. Maggie Rogers) - Live From Brooklyn"	5:53
17.	"Pink Skies - Live From Minneapolis"	4:28
18.	"Starved - Live From Sacramento"	5:46
19.	"American Nights - Live From Foxborough"	3:59
20.	"I Remember Everything (feat. Kacey Musgraves) - Live From Chicago"	4:35
21.	"Hey Driver (feat. The War & Treaty) - Live From Washington, D.C."	5:20
22.	"Burn, Burn, Burn - Live From Denver"	4:35
23.	"Oklahoma Son - Live From Oklahoma City"	4:10
24.	"Quittin' Time - Live From Salt Lake City"	4:51
25.	"Revival - Live From Knoxville"	14:02
Total length:		118:42

== Charts ==
Chart performance for 24 (Live)
Chart (2024)	Peak position
US Americana/Folk Albums (Billboard)	20
