= River Washed Hair =

2025 single by Zach Bryan

Single by Zach Bryan
- Released: July 2, 2025
- Genre: Country
- Length: 4:21
- Label: Belting Broncos; Warner
- Songwriter: Zach Bryan
- Producer: Bryan

Zach Bryan singles chronology
"Streets of London" (2025)	"River Washed Hair" (2025)	"A Song for You" (2025)

"River Washed Hair" is a song by American singer-songwriter Zach Bryan, released on July 2, 2025 alongside his singles "Streets of London" and "A Song for You".

== Background ==
With respect to "River Washed Hair" and the other two songs released in conjunction, Zach Bryan said "They are kind of just tunes that didn't belong on the record, and they didn't fit on an EP either, so I'm just releasing them to get them out into the world 'cause I love them."

== Composition ==
The song is composed of harmonica and described as "sparse and intricate". It begins with Zach Bryan fondly recalling nights of spent with his lover, including sitting and singing around the campfire, mentioning Creedence Clearwater Revival, "Jersey Giant", "Don't Look Back in Anger" and Bruce Springsteen. He goes on to express his desire to move away in the night to start over and remorse for how he acted in his past relationship. As he travels, the surrounding scenery reminds him of her and "all of the good times I stole". He also remembers his friend Shawn drunkenly quoting Jack Kerouac and his drummer Steve Clark leaving the band. Later, Bryan anxiously thinks about his parents, wondering if his father is proud of him and feeling angry that his late mother cannot see him at concerts. In the final lines, he highlights his loneliness and longing to be reunited with his former lover.

== Charts ==
=== Weekly charts ===
Weekly chart performance for "River Washed Hair"
Chart (2025)	Peak position
Canada Hot 100 (Billboard)	60
Global 200 (Billboard)	195
New Zealand Hot Singles (RMNZ)	8
US Billboard Hot 100	53
US Hot Country Songs (Billboard)	15
US Hot Rock & Alternative Songs (Billboard)	8

=== Year-end charts ===
Year-end chart performance for "River Washed Hair"
Chart (2025)	Position
US Hot Rock & Alternative Songs (Billboard)	46

== Certifications ==
Certifications for "River Washed Hair"
Region	Certification	Certified units/sales
Canada (Music Canada)	Gold	40,000^{‡}
^{‡} Sales+streaming figures based on certification alone.
