= Appetite (Zach Bryan song) =

2026 song by Zach Bryan

Song by Zach Bryan

from the album With Heaven on Top
- Released: January 9, 2026
- Genre: Country
- Length: 3:05
- Label: Belting Broncos; Warner
- Songwriter: Zach Bryan
- Producer: Bryan

"Appetite" is a song by American singer Zach Bryan from his sixth studio album, With Heaven on Top (2026).

== Composition ==
"Appetite" is a country song with rock elements. Over horns and electric guitar riffs, Zach Bryan reflects on his shortcomings and alcohol addiction, depicting himself in an existential crisis. He contrasts his lifestyle with that of his friends, who have become sober and settled down with families, and wonders if he should have children, worrying that he would pass on his negative traits to them. Fiddle plays during the chorus, where Bryan sings about performing in northwest Arkansas to "those who don't care at all" and only for the money, picturing the consequences of being overcome by his indulgences. He eventually focuses on maturing and dealing with the pitfalls of fame. As the song progresses toward the conclusion, it introduces gentle harmonies.

== Critical reception ==
Stephen Thomas Erlewine of Pitchfork wrote that the song's extra musicians "punch up the surging chorus".

A marching band version of the song is featured in EA Sports College Football 27.

== Charts ==
Chart performance for "Appetite"
Chart (2026)	Peak position
Canada Hot 100 (Billboard)	25
Ireland (IRMA)	13
New Zealand Hot Singles (RMNZ)	7
UK Singles (Official Charts)	48
US Billboard Hot 100	38
US Hot Country Songs (Billboard)	14
US Hot Rock & Alternative Songs (Billboard)	8
