= Say Why =

2026 song by Zach Bryan

Single by Zach Bryan

from the album With Heaven on Top
- Released: March 20, 2026
- Genre: Country
- Length: 2:23
- Label: Belting Broncos; Warner
- Songwriter: Zach Bryan
- Producer: Bryan

Zach Bryan singles chronology
"Plastic Cigarette" (2026)	"Say Why" (2026)	"Lies" (2026)

"Say Why" is a song by American singer Zach Bryan from his sixth studio album, With Heaven on Top (2026). It was released as the second single from the album on March 20, 2026.

== Composition ==
The song opens with acoustic strings and violin, followed by "thundering rhythms, meaty guitars and exuberant horns". It has been compared to the style of Bruce Springsteen. Zach Bryan revolves around his struggles with alcohol in the lyrics, as he mentions spending the last of his money on a bottle of beer and details his journey to sobriety.

== Critical reception ==
Jon Dolan of Rolling Stone wrote "The fragilely pretty 'Say Why' cleverly spins the image of giving in and buying a 40 ounce at an Ohio truck stop into a reckoning of Biblical proportion (he literally figuratively carries his cross to the bar)." Matt Mitchell of Paste described the song as one that is "ready to undercut the Southwestern bombast."

== Charts ==
Chart performance for "Say Why"
Chart (2026)	Peak position
Canada Hot 100 (Billboard)	18
Canada Country (Billboard)	53
Global 200 (Billboard)	127
Ireland (IRMA)	7
New Zealand Hot Singles (RMNZ)	6
UK Singles (Official Charts)	43
US Billboard Hot 100	25
US Hot Country Songs (Billboard)	7
US Hot Rock & Alternative Songs (Billboard)	4

== Certifications ==
Certifications for "Say Why"
Region	Certification	Certified units/sales
Canada (Music Canada)	Platinum	80,000^{‡}
^{‡} Sales+streaming figures based on certification alone.
