= Lies (Zach Bryan song) =

Single by Zach Bryan featuring Lana Del Rey

from the EP Young Manhood and Other Donatable Organs
- Released: October 23, 2026
- Recorded: March – September 2026
- Studio: Easy Eye Sound, Nashville, Tennessee
- Length: 3:40
- Label: Belting Bronco; Warner
- Songwriters: Zach Bryan; Lana Del Rey
- Producers: Zach Bryan; Jamie McLaughlin; Eddie Spear

Zach Bryan singles chronology
"Say Why" (2026)	"Lies" (2026)

Lana Del Rey singles chronology
"First Light" (2026)	"Lies" (2026)

Audio video
- "Lies" on YouTube

"Lies" is a song by American singer-songwriter Zach Bryan featuring American singer-songwriter Lana Del Rey. It was released on October 15, 2026, as the third track on Bryan's fifth extended play (EP), Young Manhood and Other Donatable Organs. It was released as a single on October 23, 2026.

== Background ==
Following his 2025 cover of Del Rey's 2011 song "Video Games", Bryan shared the first snippet of the song on his TikTok account in March 2026, initially presenting it as an acoustic piano ballad. The song was recorded at Easy Eye Sound in Nashville, Tennessee, a studio owned by Dan Auerbach, and produced by Bryan, Jamie McLaughlin, and Eddie Spear. In an Instagram post on September 14, 2026, Del Rey announced that they had finally gotten their "song done", adding that it was "no lie" in a reference to the track's title. An accompanying video clip showed the two musicians alongside Del Rey's husband in the studio. Bryan announced the track as part of the EP on October 12, 2026.

== Composition ==
"Lies" is a "piano-and-strings duet" described as "weepy" and a "piano ballad", appearing as the third track on his EP Young Manhood and Other Donatable Organs. The song opens with a "piano and a sparkling string arrangement", with Bryan singing the first verse before Del Rey is heard laughing in the distance and taking the second verse, after which the two harmonize toward the end. The singers slip into the roles of two lovers who keep going back to each other, knowing it will not end well each time. Bryan offers the perspective of the "infatuated" partner, asking his significant other to keep telling him lies while acknowledging the "toxicity". They accept hearing "sweet little lies" from each other despite knowing they do not reflect reality.

== Critical reception ==
In a positive review of the song, Lana Overton of Mxdwn described it as "rooted in longing and vulnerability", praising Bryan's "heartfelt storytelling" and Del Rey's "unmistakable vocals", which come together to offer an "intimate look" at "complicated emotions". Writing for Stereogum, Tom Breihan noted that Bryan "pushed himself vocally" and that he and Del Rey sound "really good together", evoking Fleetwood Mac's "Little Lies" (1987) and Rihanna's "Stay" (2012).

Walden Green of Pitchfork compared the track's sound to that of Hozier, describing its progression from "timeless" to "dated". He likened the listening experience to being under the "fluorescent LEDs of an H&M dressing room circa 2013", noting that Del Rey's "airy delivery" elevated the song, while the duet's vocalists ultimately ended up "singing right past each other".

== Personnel ==
Adapted from Tidal

- Zach Bryan – lead vocals, writing, production, acoustic guitar
- Lana Del Rey – featured vocals, writing
- Jamie McLaughlin – production, acoustic guitar, electric guitar, engineering, mixing, synthesizer
- Eddie Spear – production, engineering, mixing
- CC Ellis – bass
- Cara Fox – cello
- Emily Rodgers – cello
- Aksel Coe – drums
- Brooke Waggoner – piano, strings arrangement
- Annaliese Kowert – violin
- Eleonore Denig – violin
- Eli Bishop – violin
- Kristin Weber – violin

== Charts ==
Chart positions for "Lies"
Chart (2026)	Peak position
Australia (ARIA)	8
Canada Hot 100 (Billboard)	4
Croatia International Airplay (Top lista)	92
Czech Republic Airplay (ČNS IFPI)	36
Global 200 (Billboard)	5
Guatemala Anglo Airplay (Monitor Latino)	14
Ireland (IRMA)	3
Lebanon (Lebanese Top 20)	18
Netherlands (Single Top 100)	86
New Zealand (Recorded Music NZ)	17
Norway (VG-lista)	8
South Africa Streaming (TOSAC)	96
Sweden (Sverigetopplistan)	3
Switzerland (Schweizer Hitparade)	60
UK Singles (Official Charts)	7
US Billboard Hot 100	4
US Hot Country Songs (Billboard)	2
US Hot Rock & Alternative Songs (Billboard)	2
