= DeAnn =

Studio album by Zach Bryan
- Released: August 24, 2019
- Recorded: 2019
- Studios: Airbnb rental, Jacksonville, Florida
- Genre: Country
- Length: 38:49
- Label: Belting Bronco
- Producer: Leo Alba

Zach Bryan chronology
DeAnn (2019)	Elisabeth (2020)

DeAnn is the debut studio album by American singer-songwriter Zach Bryan, released on August 24, 2019, through Belting Bronco. The album is named after Bryan's mother, who died in 2016. The album first charted in 2021 and debuted on the US Billboard 200 in 2023, following Bryan's increased profile and chart successes in 2022.

== Content ==
The album was recorded at an Airbnb in Jacksonville, Florida, where Bryan was stationed at the time in the US Navy. It was produced by Leo Alba and included contributions from Bryan's friends. Mattresses were placed around the walls "to improve the sound". A 2023 assessment by Stereogum's Rachel Brodsky described it as "bare-bones as it gets, with Bryan recording in AirBnBs with just himself and a guitar".

== Track listing ==
DeAnn track listing
No.	Title	Length
1.	"Flying or Crying"	2:49
2.	"Hope Again"	3:01
3.	"God Speed"	4:13
4.	"Don't Give Up on Me"	3:23
5.	"Doing Fine"	3:04
6.	"Letting Someone Go"	3:59
7.	"Shivers Down Spines"	3:00
8.	"Snow"	2:58
9.	"Man Thats Never Known You"	3:05
10.	"Moon in Oklahoma"	2:59
11.	"Condemned"	2:54
12.	"Sweet DeAnn"	3:24
Total length:		38:49

== Charts ==
Chart performance for DeAnn
Chart (2023)	Peak position
US Billboard 200	167
US Americana/Folk Albums (Billboard)	6
US Top Rock Albums (Billboard)	31

== Certifications ==
Certifications for DeAnn
Region	Certification	Certified units/sales
Canada (Music Canada)	Platinum	80,000^{‡}
United States (RIAA)	Platinum	1,000,000^{‡}
^{‡} Sales+streaming figures based on certification alone.
