= Young Manhood and Other Donatable Organs =

EP by Zach Bryan
- Released: October 16, 2026
- Length: 29:58
- Labels: Belting Bronco; Warner
- Producers: Zach Bryan; Eddie Spear; Jamie McLaughlin

Zach Bryan chronology
With Heaven on Top (2026)	Young Manhood and Other Donatable Organs (2026)

Singles from Young Manhood and Other Donatable Organs
- 1. "Lies" Released: October 23, 2026

Young Manhood and Other Donatable Organs is the fourth extended play (EP) by the American singer-songwriter Zach Bryan. It was released on October 16, 2026, via Belting Bronco and Warner Records. The track "Lies" features the singer-songwriter Lana Del Rey, and "Plainsman" features the country music band Turnpike Troubadours.

== Release ==
The EP was released on October 16, 2026, via Warner Records. It includes 8 tracks, all written by Zach Bryan. The track "Lies" features and is co-written by Lana Del Rey, while "Plainsman" features the Turnpike Troubadours and is co-written by the band's Evan Felker. To support the album, Bryan announced his 2027 all-stadium tour, Young Manhood And Other Donatable Organs Tour, which is set to visit 19 stadiums across North America and Australia.

Bryan revealed that Young Manhood was his first body of work since he quit drinking, having worried he might not be able to write good songs without alcohol. Themes of the EP include salvation, overcoming addiction, and contemplating on past events. The cover art shows Bryan aiming to shoot another version of himself on a field.

== Track listing ==
All tracks are written by Zach Bryan, except where noted. All tracks are produced by Zach Bryan, Jamie McLaughlin, and Eddie Spear.

No.	Title	Writer(s)	Length
1.	"Lodi When"		3:56
2.	"Robot Killed the Working Man"		4:35
3.	"Lies" (featuring Lana Del Rey)	Zach Bryan; Lana Del Rey	3:40
4.	"Dog Days"		3:09
5.	"Backwards"		3:33
6.	"Plainsman" (featuring Turnpike Troubadours)	Bryan; Evan Felker	3:46
7.	"Is the Blue Tangled in You?"		2:58
8.	"You'll Get By"		4:18
Total length:			29:58

== Charts ==
Chart performance for Young Manhood and Other Donatable Organs
Chart (2026)	Peak position
Australian Albums (ARIA)	4
Australian Country Albums (ARIA)	1
Canadian Albums (Billboard)	1
Dutch Albums (Album Top 100)	72
Irish Albums (Official Charts)	3
New Zealand Albums (RMNZ)	6
Norwegian Albums (IFPI Norge)	5
Swedish Albums (Sverigetopplistan)	6
Swiss Albums (Schweizer Hitparade)	41
UK Albums (Official Charts)	11
UK Americana Albums (Official Charts)	1
UK Country Albums (Official Charts)	5
US Billboard 200	2
US Americana/Folk Albums (Billboard)	1
US Top Country Albums (Billboard)	1
US Top Rock & Alternative Albums (Billboard)	2
