= Plastic Cigarette =

2026 single by Zach Bryan

Single by Zach Bryan

from the album With Heaven on Top
- Released: January 16, 2026
- Genre: Country
- Length: 3:05
- Label: Belting Broncos; Warner
- Songwriter: Zach Bryan
- Producer: Bryan

Zach Bryan singles chronology
| "We're Onto Something" (2025) | "Plastic Cigarette" (2026) | "Say Why" (2026) |

"Plastic Cigarette" is a song by American singer-songwriter Zach Bryan, released to radio on January 16, 2026 as the lead single from his sixth studio album, With Heaven on Top (2026).

== Background ==
Zach Bryan teased the song on social media prior to its release and debuted it live in June 2025 during a show at Phoenix Park in Dublin, Ireland.

== Composition ==
The song features an accompaniment of acoustic guitars and percussion. It also uses vocal harmonies to emphasize certain lines and a warmer sound for the chorus. Lyrically, Bryan centers on failed relationships, and alludes to his ex-girlfriends Hannah Duncan and Brianna "Chickenfry" LaPaglia. He begins by mentioning that he has not written a love song in a long time. In the next verse, Bryan addresses some of his personal struggles, singing about someone who told him to quit drinking and thought he would die before the age of 30, and references the impact of his parents' divorce during his childhood. He tells his former partner that they should move on in the chorus, while in the third verse Bryan draws an analogy between her collecting shells on the beach and starting a relationship with him, before referencing his first meeting with LaPaglia (during his concert in Queens) while calling her "evil". The song ends with him accepting the end of a relationship.

== Critical reception ==
Regarding the song's lyrical content about LaPaglia, Billy Dukes of Taste of Country wrote "It's obscure and to focus on it is to miss some pretty poetry during the first verse and chorus." Matt Mitchell of Paste described the song as "especially pleasant" and commented "the last lines ('I saw you on the river's edge, draggin' on a plastic cigarette with your swim top still wet') make vaping sound halfway pretty."

== Charts ==
Chart performance for "Plastic Cigarette"
| Chart (2026) | Peak position |
|---|---|
| Australia (ARIA) | 43 |
| Canada Hot 100 (Billboard) | 11 |
| Global 200 (Billboard) | 49 |
| Ireland (IRMA) | 5 |
| New Zealand Hot Singles (RMNZ) | 3 |
| Norway (IFPI Norge) | 42 |
| Sweden (Sverigetopplistan) | 35 |
| UK Singles (OCC) | 29 |
| US Billboard Hot 100 | 13 |
| US Hot Country Songs (Billboard) | 2 |
| US Hot Rock & Alternative Songs (Billboard) | 3 |

== Certifications ==
Certifications for "Plastic Cigarette"
| Region | Certification | Certified units/sales |
|---|---|---|
| Canada (Music Canada) | Platinum | 80,000^{‡} |
^{‡} Sales+streaming figures based on certification alone.
