= Dawns (song) =

Single by Zach Bryan featuring Maggie Rogers
- Released: January 27, 2023
- Length: 4:50
- Label: Warner
- Songwriters: Zach Bryan; Maggie Rogers
- Producers: Zach Bryan; Eddie Spear

Zach Bryan singles chronology
"Burn, Burn, Burn" (2022)	"Dawns" (2023)	"I Remember Everything" (2023)

Maggie Rogers singles chronology
"Horses" (2022)	"Dawns" (2023)

Music video
- "Dawns" on YouTube

"Dawns" is a song by American singer-songwriter Zach Bryan featuring singer Maggie Rogers, released on January 27, 2023, through Belting Bronco and Warner Records. It was co-written by Bryan and Rogers, and produced by Bryan and Eddie Spear. A music video was released simultaneously. The song entered the top 50 of the charts in Canada, Ireland and the US.

== Critical reception ==
Ann Powers of NPR wrote that "the addition of a woman's voice allows the duo to play with perspective and, in doing so, refresh the template of Bryan's laments" and when "Rogers enters the picture", "her verse flips the song's angle and cleverly changes the meaning of its hook".

Uproxx included it on their "Best Songs of 2023 So Far" list, with Philip Cosores writing that it "isn't really a country song at all, showing the range and possibility for a young artist that doesn't have expectations yet to defy", pointing out its "male-female vocal tradeoffs and driving string section" that "underscore the song's emotional pull". Cosores concluded that "Bryan is turning out great songs by the dozen these days".

== Live performances ==
Bryan and Rogers performed the song at the Crypto.com Arena in Los Angeles on August 23, 2023, as part of Bryan's Burn, Burn, Burn Tour.

== Charts ==
=== Weekly charts ===
Weekly chart performance for "Dawns"
Chart (2023)	Peak position
Australia (ARIA)	64
Canada Hot 100 (Billboard)	47
Global 200 (Billboard)	99
Ireland (IRMA)	36
New Zealand Hot Singles (RMNZ)	15
US Billboard Hot 100	42
US Hot Country Songs (Billboard)	11
US Hot Rock & Alternative Songs (Billboard)	4

=== Year-end charts ===
Year-end chart performance for "Dawns"
Chart (2023)	Position
US Hot Country Songs (Billboard)	40
US Hot Rock & Alternative Songs (Billboard)	9

== Certifications ==
Certifications for "Dawns"
Region	Certification	Certified units/sales
Australia (ARIA)	Gold	35,000^{‡}
Canada (Music Canada)	5× Platinum	400,000^{‡}
New Zealand (RMNZ)	Platinum	30,000^{‡}
United Kingdom (BPI)	Gold	400,000^{‡}
United States (RIAA)	3× Platinum	3,000,000^{‡}
^{‡} Sales+streaming figures based on certification alone.
