= Burn, Burn, Burn =

2022 single by Zach Bryan

Single by Zach Bryan
- Released: September 8, 2022
- Genre: Country
- Length: 4:28
- Label: Belting Broncos; Warner
- Songwriter: Zach Bryan
- Producers: Bryan; Eddie Spear

Zach Bryan singles chronology
"Open the Gate" (2022)	"Burn, Burn, Burn" (2022)	"Starved" (2022)

"Burn, Burn, Burn" is a single by American singer-songwriter Zach Bryan, released on September 8, 2022. It was produced by Bryan himself and Eddie Spear.

== Background ==
Zach Bryan took inspiration from the sentiment and avant-garde structure of the novel On the Road by Jack Kerouac to write the song. The novel uses the word "burn" to describe people who passionately follow their wanted path in life and are not motivated by consumerism or greed. The title of the song also references the following passage from the novel:

The only people for me are the mad ones, the ones who are mad to live, mad to talk, mad to be saved, desirous of everything at the same time, the ones who never yawn or saw a commonplace thing, but burn, burn, burn like fabulous yellow roman candles exploding like spiders across the stars.

Bryan first released the song via YouTube on August 16, 2022, before releasing it to streaming services on September 8.

== Composition and lyrics ==
"Burn, Burn, Burn" is an acoustic song centering on Zach Bryan's aversion toward the vanity and insincerity found in modern life and wistful longing for a simple life. He lists off the activities of his ideal life, such as driving on a back road, composing songs on guitar and visiting loved ones, and sings "I want to be a child climbing trees somewhere / Breathing in the fresh, outside air / Before I knew this life was unkind / I want a well-trained dog and on a couple acres / A kind, kind lady and a place to take her / And a few good friends I can count on one of my hands". Bryan also mentions the unpleasant parts of this life, including contemplating death, feeling lonely, and getting into fights, but points out that although the life he wants may not always bring happiness, it is still authentic.

== Charts ==
Chart performance for "Burn, Burn, Burn"
Chart (2022–2024)	Peak position
Canada Hot 100 (Billboard)	74
US Billboard Hot 100	93
US Hot Country Songs (Billboard)	24
US Hot Rock & Alternative Songs (Billboard)	12

== Certifications ==
Certifications for "Burn, Burn, Burn"
Region	Certification	Certified units/sales
Australia (ARIA)	Platinum	70,000^{‡}
Canada (Music Canada)	6× Platinum	480,000^{‡}
New Zealand (RMNZ)	Platinum	30,000^{‡}
United Kingdom (BPI)	Gold	400,000^{‡}
United States (RIAA)	4× Platinum	4,000,000^{‡}
^{‡} Sales+streaming figures based on certification alone.
