= I Remember Everything =

Single by Zach Bryan featuring Kacey Musgraves

from the album Zach Bryan
- Released: September 8, 2023
- Genre: Country
- Length: 3:47
- Label: Belting Bronco; Warner
- Songwriters: Zach Bryan; Kacey Musgraves
- Producer: Zach Bryan

Zach Bryan singles chronology
"Dawns" (2023)	"I Remember Everything" (2023)	"Pink Skies" (2024)

Kacey Musgraves singles chronology
"Sitting in the Corner" (2022)	"I Remember Everything" (2023)	"She Calls Me Back" (2023)

"I Remember Everything" is a song by American singer Zach Bryan featuring country music artist Kacey Musgraves. It appeared as track eleven on his fourth studio album Zach Bryan, released on August 25, 2023, and was sent to radio airplay in Italy on September 8, as the lead single from the album.

At the 66th Annual Grammy Awards the song was nominated for Best Country Song and Best Country Duo/Group Performance, winning the latter. Commercially the song debuted at number one on the US Billboard Hot 100, becoming both Bryan's and Musgraves's first number-one song. It became the first song to top the Hot 100, Hot Country Songs and Hot Rock & Alternative Songs charts simultaneously. The song also reached the top ten in Canada, Ireland, Australia and New Zealand.

== Background ==
While putting finishing touches on the song, Bryan shared the title and a short preview on June 14, 2023. Initial confusion sparked by the title of a John Prine ballad of the same name led Bryan to explain that he wanted to change the song title at first but ultimately went with it as is since a change did not "sit right" with him. He played an acoustic rendition of the track on his Instagram on July 25.

== Composition ==
"I Remember Everything", a "sparse ballad" about "love and life", reflects a conversation between a man and a woman who used to love each other. While the protagonists were widely noted as being in a relationship, the song could as well talk about a "past summer beach romance" in an "'88 Ford", as suggested by Rolling Stone. The couple in question reaffirms the authenticity of their past feelings and experiences through their lyrics. The couple shares "tragically different perspectives" on alcohol and its role throughout their relationship. While Bryan reminisces on the upside of their relationship, Musgraves recalls more negative connotations, accusing him of not being the man he once swore to be. Accompanied by just an acoustic guitar and a set of strings towards the end, Bryan croons "painstakingly simple yet poetic" lines that Musgraves opposes as his counterpart. Their energy on the track together was described as "a gale", combining Musgraves' signature elements of "yearning" and Bryan's "reputation on strong songwriting".

== Accolades ==
Award nominations for "I Remember Everything"
Year	Ceremony	Award	Ref.
2023	Billboard Music Awards	Top Rock Song	Nominated
2024	Grammy Awards	Best Country Song	Nominated
2024	Grammy Awards	Best Country Duo/Group Performance	Won
2024	People's Choice Awards	The Collaboration Song of the Year	Nominated
2024	Academy of Country Music Awards	Music Event of the Year	Nominated
2024	People's Choice Country Awards	The Song of 2024	Nominated
2024	People's Choice Country Awards	The Collaboration Song of 2024	Won

== Commercial performance ==
=== United States ===
The song was a groundbreaking success and marked several historical achievements. After its first week, the song debuted at number one of the Billboard Hot 100 with 33.7 million streams, 263,000 airplay audience and sold 10,000 downloads, becoming both Bryan and Musgraves' first number one song on the chart, and the 70th song to debut atop the chart. The song also debuted at number one on the Streaming Songs chart and peaked at four on Digital Song Sales.

The song become the first to top the Hot 100, Hot Country Songs and Hot Rock & Alternative Songs charts simultaneously since the chart were published. The song remained at the top of the Hot Rock & Alternative chart for 30 consecutive weeks, giving it the 4th most weeks atop the chart at that time. It is also the 25th song to have topped both the Hot 100 and Hot Country Songs. Despite its commercial success, the song received only moderate radio airplay, reaching 26 on the Country Airplay chart and 30 on the Pop Airplay chart.

=== International ===
In Canada, "I Remember Everything" debuted at number two on the Canadian Hot 100, becoming both Bryan and Musgraves' first top ten song on the chart. The song also peaked at number sixteen on the Canada Country chart; "I Remember Everything" marked Bryan's second entry and Musgraves' seventh in the rankings, as well as the highest placement for both artists.

In the United Kingdom, the song debuted at number fifty-six on the Official Singles Chart, becoming Musgraves' first appearance on the chart and Bryan's second entry. "I Remember Everything" peaked at number fourteen on the chart on week ending on January 18, 2024. In Ireland, the song peaked at number five on the Irish Singles Chart, becoming both artist highest placement on the chart.

"I Remember Everything" debuted at number nineteen on the ARIA Singles Chart, becoming Musgraves' first appearance on the chart. The song peaked on the chart at six on the week ending on October 20, 2023, giving Bryan two simultaneously top ten songs, charting with "Something in the Orange".

== Charts ==
=== Weekly charts ===
Weekly chart performance for "I Remember Everything"
Chart (2023–2024)	Peak position
Australia (ARIA)	6
Canada Hot 100 (Billboard)	2
Canada Country (Billboard)	14
Global 200 (Billboard)	4
Ireland (IRMA)	5
New Zealand (Recorded Music NZ)	10
Norway (VG-lista)	9
Sweden (Sverigetopplistan)	20
UK Singles (Official Charts)	14
US Billboard Hot 100	1
US Adult Pop Airplay (Billboard)	17
US Country Airplay (Billboard)	26
US Hot Country Songs (Billboard)	1
US Hot Rock & Alternative Songs (Billboard)	1
US Pop Airplay (Billboard)	30

=== Year-end charts ===
2023 year-end chart performance for "I Remember Everything"
Chart (2023)	Position
Australia (ARIA)	79
Canada (Canadian Hot 100)	67
US Billboard Hot 100	74
US Hot Country Songs (Billboard)	22
US Hot Rock & Alternative Songs (Billboard)	6

2024 year-end chart performance for "I Remember Everything"
Chart (2024)	Position
Australia (ARIA)	11
Canada (Canadian Hot 100)	9
Global 200 (Billboard)	12
New Zealand (Recorded Music NZ)	18
Sweden (Sverigetopplistan)	43
UK Singles (OCC)	39
US Billboard Hot 100	9
US Hot Country Songs (Billboard)	3
US Hot Rock & Alternative Songs (Billboard)	1

2025 year-end chart performance for "I Remember Everything"
Chart (2025)	Position
Australia (ARIA)	59
Global 200 (Billboard)	139
Sweden (Sverigetopplistan)	60

== Certifications ==
Certifications for "I Remember Everything"
Region	Certification	Certified units/sales
Australia (ARIA)	Platinum	70,000^{‡}
Canada (Music Canada)	Diamond	800,000^{‡}
Denmark (IFPI Danmark)	Gold	45,000^{‡}
New Zealand (RMNZ)	5× Platinum	150,000^{‡}
Portugal (AFP)	Gold	12,000^{‡}
United Kingdom (BPI)	Platinum	600,000^{‡}
United States (RIAA)	Diamond	10,000,000^{‡}
^{‡} Sales+streaming figures based on certification alone.

== Release history ==
Release history for "I Remember Everything"
Region	Date	Format	Label	Ref.
Italy	September 8, 2023	Radio airplay	Warner	
United States	September 11, 2023	Country radio	Warner	
United States	September 26, 2023	Contemporary hit radio	Warner	
