= With Heaven on Top =

Studio album by Zach Bryan
- Released: January 9, 2026
- Genres: Country; alternative country
- Length: 78:16
- Labels: Belting Bronco; Warner
- Producer: Zach Bryan

Zach Bryan chronology
24 (Live) (2024)	With Heaven on Top (2026)	Young Manhood and Other Donatable Organs (2026)

Singles from With Heaven on Top
- 1. "Plastic Cigarette" Released: January 16, 2026; 2. "Say Why" Released: March 20, 2026

With Heaven on Top is the sixth studio album by American country music singer‑songwriter Zach Bryan. It was released on January 9, 2026, through Belting Bronco Records and Warner Music Group. The album was written and produced entirely by Bryan and contains 25 tracks (24 songs and one spoken poem). It is anticipated to be Bryan's final release with a major record label.

The album was supported by two singles: "Plastic Cigarette" (January 16, 2026) and "Say Why" (March 20, 2026). With Heaven on Top debuted at number one on the US Billboard 200 with 134,000 album-equivalent units, becoming Bryan's second chart‑topping album. Elsewhere, it charted at number one in Canada and Ireland.

== Background ==
In February 2025, Bryan announced to Instagram that With Heaven on Top was scheduled for release, saying, "With Heaven On Top the EP is out sooner than not."

Bryan released "Madeline" on July 18, 2025. The song was announced for upcoming release a week prior via social media, in addition to the cover art being revealed. "Madeline" had been anticipated to be the lead single from With Heaven on Top, however, when it was released, the song did not appear on the album. Shortly following the release of the song, the cover artwork for With Heaven on Top was released to social media. Bryan also announced the album's scheduled release date. While the album was initially anticipated to be an extended play, it was later announced to be a full-length studio album. On January 8, 2026, the track listing to With Heaven on Top was announced. He also announced an acoustic version, which was released on January 12, 2026.

== Reception ==
With Heaven on Top ratings
Aggregate scores
Source	Rating
Metacritic	74/100
Review scores
Source	Rating
AllMusic	4/5 stars
Clash	8/10
Consequence	B+
Paste	7.8/10
Pitchfork	7.0/10
Rolling Stone	3.5/5
The Michigan Daily	B+
The New Yorker	(favorable)

=== Critical ===
With Heaven on Top was met with generally positive reviews. At Metacritic, which assigns a normalized rating out of 100 to reviews from professional publications, the album received an average score of 74, based on six reviews. Fred Thomas of AllMusic described the record as a "sprawling, 25-song collection that finds the songwriter expanding his country and Americana sound." Julian Gandel of The Michigan Daily characterized it as an "alternative country album" that "mostly sticks to fairly standard instrumentation," awarding it a B+ grade. Max Lipton of Paste noted the album's position within Bryan's evolution from "Springsteen-esque folk" toward more expansive sonic territory. In The New Yorker, the critic described the album as "a shaggy record composed of twenty‑four songs (and one poem) about chasing peace of mind around the world." The review praised Bryan's "uncommonly stubborn" approach, noting that the recordings "evoke the blurry conviviality of a bar band at the moment between last call and lights on." While pointing out some repetitive moments (such as the word "miles" repeated 42 times), the review highlighted "Plastic Cigarette" as a standout, and called the title track "a benediction, sweetened with pedal steel, that is beautiful in a way much of Bryan's music is defiantly not." The piece also noted that Bryan released an acoustic version of the album days later, "which contains almost nothing but an acoustic guitar and Bryan's voice, demonstrating how little adornment his best songs need."

=== Commercial ===
With Heaven on Top debuted at No. 1 on the Billboard 200 dated January 24, 2026, earning 134,000 equivalent album units (including 127,000 from streaming, equating to 130.32 million on‑demand streams of the album's tracks). It marked Bryan's second No. 1 album, following his 2023 self‑titled release. The album also debuted at No. 1 on the Top Streaming Albums chart and No. 7 on Top Album Sales. A deluxe reissue on January 12, 2026, added 24 bonus acoustic tracks.

== Track listing ==
All tracks are written by Zach Bryan.

With Heaven on Top track listing
No.	Title	Length
1.	"Down, Down, Stream"	1:59
2.	"Runny Eggs"	3:52
3.	"Appetite"	3:05
4.	"DeAnn's Denim"	2:41
5.	"Say Why"	2:24
6.	"Drowning"	3:05
7.	"Santa Fe"	2:54
8.	"Skin"	2:55
9.	"Dry Deserts"	2:31
10.	"Bad News"	3:16
11.	"South and Pine"	3:22
12.	"Cannonball"	3:58
13.	"Slicked Back"	3:51
14.	"Anyways"	3:24
15.	"If They Come Lookin'"	2:28
16.	"Rivers and Creeks"	3:35
17.	"Plastic Cigarette"	3:06
18.	"You Can Still Come Home"	3:41
19.	"Aeroplane"	2:20
20.	"Always Willin'"	4:05
21.	"Miles"	3:31
22.	"All Good Things Past"	4:02
23.	"Camper"	2:15
24.	"Sundown Girls"	2:03
25.	"With Heaven on Top"	3:53
Total length:		78:16

== Personnel ==
Credits adapted from Tidal.

=== Musicians ===
- Zach Bryan – lead vocals (all tracks), electric guitar (tracks 3, 6–10, 13), acoustic guitar (4–6, 11, 12, 16, 17, 21–25)
- Noah Legros – electric guitar (2–7, 9, 10, 13, 16, 18, 21, 24, 25), background vocals (2)
- Zephyr Avalon – bass (2, 3, 5–7, 9–13, 16, 18, 21, 22, 24), acoustic bass (4)
- Keenan O'Meara – acoustic guitar (2, 3, 5–7, 9, 13), piano (7, 9, 10), background vocals (7, 9, 12, 16, 18, 22, 24)
- Nate Head – drums (2, 3, 5–7, 9–11, 13, 16, 18, 22, 24, 25), tambourine (12)
- Read Connolly – pedal steel guitar (2, 3, 5, 6, 8–10, 18, 22, 25), Dobro (16), banjo (22, 24)
- William Werthimer – trumpet (2, 3, 5, 9–11, 13, 16, 18, 22, 25)
- Heaven Schmitt – background vocals (3, 5–9, 11, 12, 16, 18, 22, 24, 25)
- Ana Monwah Lei – cello (3, 5–7, 9–12, 16, 18, 22, 24, 25)
- Lucas Ruge-Jones – fiddle (3, 5, 6, 10–12, 18, 22, 24, 25), violin (7, 9, 16), background vocals (7, 9), mandolin (7)
- Samantha Uzbay – viola (3, 5–7, 9–12, 16, 18, 22, 24, 25)
- Hannah Cohen – violin (3, 5–7, 9–12, 16, 18, 22, 24, 25)
- Andy McCormick – tenor saxophone (3, 5–7, 9, 10, 18, 22, 25)
- Isaac Washam – trombone (3, 5–7, 9, 10, 18, 22, 25)
- Austin Stunkard – trumpet (3, 5–7, 9, 10, 18, 22, 25)
- Ryan Hatcher – trumpet (3, 5–7, 9, 10, 18, 22, 25)
- Junior Carroll – piano (3, 5, 18, 22)
- Sasha Ono – cello (3, 6, 9, 22, 25)
- Jake Weinberg – electric guitar (4, 23), percussion (6, 9), acoustic guitar (8, 13, 17, 23), background vocals (8, 17, 24), bass (8), drums (17, 23); piano, synthesizer, Wurlitzer (23)
- Scott Zhang – piano (4, 8, 11), organ (11); acoustic guitar, background vocals, bass (17)
- Graham Bright – electric guitar (5)
- Greg Fallis – trombone (5, 18, 22)
- Gabe Wax – background vocals (7, 8, 17), drums (8, 23), baritone guitar (17), bass (23)
- Chris Braun – electric guitar (8)

=== Technical ===
- Zach Bryan – production
- Gabe Wax – engineering (2–13, 16–18, 21–25), mixing (16, 17)
- Jake Weinberg – engineering (2–13, 16–18, 21–25), mixing (16)
- Scott Zhang – engineering (2–13, 16–18, 21, 22, 24, 25)
- Colton Jean – engineering (8, 17, 23), engineering assistance (2–7, 9–13, 16, 18, 22, 24, 25)
- Jacquire King – mixing (2–13, 18, 22–24)
- Jacob Spitzer – mixing assistance (16)
- Pete Lyman – mastering (2–13, 16–18, 21–23)

== Charts ==
Chart performance for With Heaven on Top
Chart (2026)	Peak position
Australian Albums (ARIA)	4
Australian Country Albums (ARIA)	1
Austrian Albums (Ö3 Austria)	49
Belgian Albums (Ultratop Flanders)	109
Canadian Albums (Billboard)	1
Croatian International Albums (HDU)	15
Danish Albums (Hitlisten)	39
Dutch Albums (Album Top 100)	20
French Physical Albums (SNEP)	149
French Rock & Metal Albums (SNEP)	37
Hungarian Physical Albums (MAHASZ)	30
Irish Albums (Official Charts)	1
New Zealand Albums (RMNZ)	5
Norwegian Albums (IFPI Norge)	5
Scottish Albums (Official Charts)	8
Swedish Albums (Sverigetopplistan)	12
Swiss Albums (Schweizer Hitparade)	17
UK Albums (Official Charts)	3
UK Americana Albums (Official Charts)	1
UK Country Albums (Official Charts)	1
US Billboard 200	1
US Americana/Folk Albums (Billboard)	1
US Top Country Albums (Billboard)	1
US Top Rock & Alternative Albums (Billboard)	1

== Certifications ==
Certifications for With Heaven on Top
Region	Certification	Certified units/sales
Canada (Music Canada)	Platinum	80,000^{‡}
United Kingdom (BPI)	Silver	60,000^{‡}
^{‡} Sales+streaming figures based on certification alone.

== Release history ==
Release history and formats for With Heaven on Top
Region	Date	Format(s)	Version	Label(s)	Ref.
Various	January 9, 2026	CD; LP; digital download; streaming	Original	Belting Bronco; Warner	
Various	January 12, 2026	Digital download; streaming	Acoustic	Belting Bronco; Warner	
