= Revival (Zach Bryan song) =

2020 song by Zach Bryan

Song by Zach Bryan

from the album Elisabeth
- Released: May 8, 2020
- Genre: Country
- Length: 3:41
- Label: Belting Bronco
- Songwriter: Zach Bryan
- Producer: Zach Bryan

"Revival" is a song by American country music singer Zach Bryan—released on May 8, 2020 as the 18th and closing track from his second studio album Elisabeth. It was written and produced by Bryan himself, while also being produced by Leo Alba. The song received a gold certification by the RIAA on October 13, 2023. It is often performed as the encore at Bryan's concerts.

== Composition and critical reception ==
Alex Harris of NeonMusic reviewed the song in a positive manner, stating "This evocative scene sets the stage for Zach Bryan's 'Revival', a song that transcends the boundaries of a simple track and transforms into a potent exploration of redemption, raw honesty, and the enduring power of human connection." In the same review—Harris also stated, "A cornerstone of Bryan’s acclaimed album [Elisabeth], 'Revival' quickly established itself as a fan favorite."

Maxim Mower of Holler noted: "Although not one of his [Zach Bryan’s] biggest or most commercially successful singles by any means, Zach Bryan’s 'Revival' quickly blossomed into a fan favorite in the truest sense." Maxim Mower in the same review later mentioned the songs sound, mentioning "Narratively, 'Revival' feels as though it takes place in a sweaty, alcohol-soaked dive bar in the early hours of the morning, with Zach Bryan and his buddies teaming up for a night-long party."

== Other versions ==
On December 25, 2022, Bryan released a 12 minute live version of "Revival". The respective version was included on his debut live album, All My Homies Hate Ticketmaster (Live from Red Rocks)—appearing as the 24th and closing track.

== Charts ==
Chart performance for "Revival"
Chart (2023–2025)	Peak position
Canada Hot 100 (Billboard)	67
Ireland (IRMA)	2
UK Singles (Official Charts)	88
US Bubbling Under Hot 100 (Billboard)	1
US Hot Rock & Alternative Songs (Billboard)	9

== Certifications ==
Certifications for "Revival"
Region	Certification	Certified units/sales
Canada (Music Canada)	5× Platinum	400,000^{‡}
New Zealand (RMNZ)	Platinum	30,000^{‡}
United Kingdom (BPI)	Silver	200,000^{‡}
United States (RIAA)	3× Platinum	3,000,000^{‡}
^{‡} Sales+streaming figures based on certification alone.
