= The Great American Bar Scene =

Studio album by Zach Bryan
- Released: July 4, 2024
- Genres: Americana; heartland rock; red dirt; folk
- Length: 62:59
- Labels: Belting Bronco; Warner
- Producers: Chris Braun; Zach Bryan; Jacquire King; John Mayer; Scott Zhang

Zach Bryan chronology
Boys of Faith (2023)	The Great American Bar Scene (2024)	24 (Live) (2024)

Singles from The Great American Bar Scene
- 1. "Pink Skies" Released: May 24, 2024

The Great American Bar Scene is the fifth studio album by American singer-songwriter Zach Bryan, released on July 4, 2024, through Belting Bronco and Warner. The album was released just over 10 months after his self-titled 2023 album, and was preceded by the single "Pink Skies". It features guest appearances from Noeline Hofmann, John Moreland, John Mayer, Bruce Springsteen, and Watchhouse.

== Background ==
On April 1, 2024, the website Whiskey Riff announced the release of the album for June and features from Mayer, Springsteen and the Avett Brothers as an April Fool's joke. Bryan officially announced the record the following month, with features from Mayer and Springsteen.

== Critical reception ==
Professional ratings
Aggregate scores
Source	Rating
Metacritic	73/100
Review scores
Source	Rating
AllMusic	3/5 stars
Paste	6.9/10
Pitchfork	7.0/10
Rolling Stone	4/5 stars
Sputnikmusic	3.5/5

The Great American Bar Scene received a score of 73 out of 100 on review aggregator Metacritic based on six critics' reviews, which the website categorized as "generally favorable" reception.

Billboard's Melinda Newman felt that "the album feels less overstuffed than American Heartbreak, but could have still used a trim or two given the relative sameness in the sound of the tracks", although the songs "continue to deliver an emotional wallop thanks to his economical, but cinematic, trenchant lyrics". Chris Willman of Variety wrote that The Great American Bar Scene "actually feels a lot less stark than last year's self-titled record did" and there is "no mistaking how much the spirit of Springsteen looms over the album, as much as it has over much of Bryan's short, meteoric career to date".

Claire Shaffer of Pitchfork felt that the album "adds to the Zach Bryan formula by taking on a wider lens, weaving his personal struggles and triumphs into the greater legacy of lost souls and camaraderie found in America's watering holes". Jonathan Bernstein of Rolling Stone acclaimed Bryan's "writing that blends endearing Kerouac cosplay, Instagram poetry, and Proustian profundity, sometimes from one line to the next" on tracks that "feel like a batch of old friends largely because of Bryan's other magical gift: his knack for absorbing and transforming his many influences into something that feels uniquely his own". Country Chord's Brennen Kelly wrote that "this record is not about the titular great, American bar scene but instead is about all of the stories swapped, memories made and people met there", noting that Bryan crafted narratives that would be brought up in quiet conversations at a bar.

Reviewing the album for Paste, Tom Williams wrote that it "feels like a retread of Bryan's self-titled LP from last year—so much so that you wouldn't be surprised if the Oklahoman hitmaker were to announce that these songs were all B-sides from the Zach Bryan sessions". A Sputnikmusic staff review also stated that it "settle[s] into something of a familiar groove. He tries throwing John Mayer and Bruce Springsteen features into the mix, but the results are ultimately the same: more slow-to-mid tempo country crooners with results-may-vary emotional resonance". Stephen Thomas Erlewine of AllMusic stated that the songs on the album "are poetic, plump with purple imagery and plaintive rhymes" and praised the collaborations with Bruce Springsteen and John Mayer. Erlewine wrote that the tracks "Sandpaper" and "Better Days" helps to pull "Bryan's aspirations into focus: where the rest of the record seems caught in its own head, these tunes have a forward motion that makes the rest of The Great American Bar Scene seem relatively bereft of musical imagination".

== Commercial performance ==
In the United States, The Great American Bar Scene debuted at number 17 on the Billboard 200 with 32,000 album-equivalent units—the low sales was due to the album being released during the end of a tracking week, on July 4, 2024. The following week on the Billboard 200, The Great American Bar Scene vaulted from number 17 to number 2—moving 137,000 album equivalent units (including 8,500 in pure album sales), marking Bryan's fourth top-ten charting effort on the Billboard 200. The album was blocked from the number-one position on the Billboard 200 by Taylor Swift’s The Tortured Poets Department—which was serving its 12th consecutive week at number one. The Great American Bar Scene dropped one position to number three the following week—its third Billboard 200 charting week, moving an additional 88,000 album-equivalent units.

== Track listing ==
All tracks are written by Zach Bryan, except for "The Way Back", co-written with Jim Vallance^{[a]}, "Memphis; the Blues", co-written with John Moreland, and "Purple Gas", solely written by Noeline Hofmann.

The Great American Bar Scene track listing
No.	Title	Length
1.	"Lucky Enough (Poem)"	2:42
2.	"Mechanical Bull"	3:28
3.	"The Great American Bar Scene"	3:36
4.	"28"	3:53
5.	"American Nights"	3:38
6.	"Oak Island"	3:59
7.	"Purple Gas" (with Noeline Hofmann)	3:00
8.	"Boons"	3:05
9.	"The Way Back"	3:05
10.	"Memphis; the Blues" (featuring John Moreland^{[b]})	3:09
11.	"Like Ida"	3:35
12.	"Bass Boat"	3:36
13.	"Better Days" (featuring John Mayer)	3:32
14.	"Towers"	2:50
15.	"Sandpaper" (featuring Bruce Springsteen)	3:36
16.	"Northern Thunder"	3:30
17.	"Funny Man"	3:16
18.	"Pink Skies" (featuring Watchhouse)	3:49
19.	"Bathwater"	1:40
Total length:		62:59

=== Notes ===
- The album version of "Pink Skies" features an extended outro by Watchhouse, extending the length from 3:14 to 3:49.
- ^{^[a]}"The Way Back" contains interpolations of "Heaven", written by Bryan Adams and Jim Vallance and performed by Adams.
- ^{^[b]}Due to Bryan and Moreland falling out, "Memphis; the Blues" was temporarily removed from streaming services on May 9, 2025; it was reinstated on June 11, 2025, with Moreland being replaced by J.R. Carroll.

== Personnel ==
- Zach Bryan – lead vocals (all tracks), production (all tracks), guitars (tracks 1–8, 10–14, 16–19), harmonica (2, 3, 8), piano (9, 12), drums (17), engineering (12)
- Chris Braun – production (track 3, 13), engineering (3, 12–15, 17, 19), additional arrangement (1, 13, 15), electric guitar (3, 6, 14, 15), acoustic slide guitar (2), bass guitar (3, 4, 11) percussion (3), guitars (13), nylon-string guitar (10, 17), baritone guitar (11, 15), background vocals (4, 12, 13, 19), slide guitar (17)
- Jake Weinberg – engineering (tracks 1, 2, 4–12, 14–19), drums (2, 4–7, 10, 11, 13–16, 18), bass guitar (2, 8, 14, 18, 19), background vocals (4, 5, 8, 12, 13), upright bass (7), acoustic guitar (8), synthesizer (15), Dobro (17, 19)
- Scott Zhang – production (track 13), mixing (12), engineering (2, 4–6, 10, 11, 13–15, 17, 19), piano (2, 4, 5, 11, 13, 14, 17, 19), background vocals (5, 13–15), electric guitar (5), bass guitar (6, 15), trumpet (6), tambourine (11)
- Read Connolly – pedal steel guitar (track 3), Dobro (9, 16), banjo (18)
- Mike Robinson – pedal steel guitar (tracks 4, 11)
- Hannah Cohen – fiddle (tracks 4, 14)
- Ana Monwah Lei – cello (track 4)
- Graham Bright – electric guitar (track 4)
- Gabe Wax – engineering (tracks 1, 2, 5, 7–10, 14, 16–19), bass guitar (5, 17), background vocals (5, 19)
- Noah Legros – guitars (9)
- Noeline Hofmann – guitars, vocals (track 7)
- Zephyr Avalon – upright bass (track 9), bass guitar (13, 16)
- Nate Head – background vocals, drums (track 9)
- John Moreland – bass guitar, Dobro, vocals (track 10)
- Patrick Kelly – bass guitar (track 12)
- Morgan Meinert – background vocals (track 12)
- John Mayer – guitars, background vocals, production (track 13)
- Amanda Broadway – choir (track 14)
- Greg Breal – choir (track 14)
- Jeremy Lister – choir (track 14)
- Kendra Chantelle – choir (track 14)
- Kristen Rogers – choir (track 14)
- Kyla Jade – choir (track 14)
- Ronnie Robertson – choir (track 14)
- Samson White – choir (track 14)
- Dawson March – piano (track 14)
- Bruce Springsteen – vocals (track 15)
- Bree Tranter – background vocals (track 16)
- Andrew Marlin – background vocals, mandolin (track 18)
- Emily Frantz – background vocals (track 18)
- Jacquire King – production (tracks 9, 10, 14, 15, 17), mixing (1–11, 13–19)
- Pete Lyman – mastering
- Hudson Pollock – mixing (track 12)
- Jordan Lehning – choir arrangement (track 14)
- Owen Barrett – engineering assistance (track 12)

== Charts ==
=== Weekly charts ===
Weekly chart performance for The Great American Bar Scene
Chart (2024)	Peak position
Australian Albums (ARIA)	3
Australian Country Albums (ARIA)	1
Belgian Albums (Ultratop Flanders)	164
Canadian Albums (Billboard)	1
Dutch Albums (Album Top 100)	58
Hungarian Physical Albums (MAHASZ)	25
Irish Albums (Official Charts)	2
New Zealand Albums (RMNZ)	4
Norwegian Albums (VG-lista)	10
Scottish Albums (Official Charts)	23
Swedish Albums (Sverigetopplistan)	26
UK Albums (Official Charts)	16
UK Americana Albums (Official Charts)	2
UK Country Albums (Official Charts)	1
US Billboard 200	2
US Americana/Folk Albums (Billboard)	1
US Top Country Albums (Billboard)	1
US Top Rock & Alternative Albums (Billboard)	1

=== Year-end charts ===
2024 year-end chart performance for The Great American Bar Scene
Chart (2024)	Position
Australian Country Albums (ARIA)	15
Canadian Albums (Billboard)	40
US Billboard 200	53
US Top Country Albums (Billboard)	11

2025 year-end chart performance for The Great American Bar Scene
Chart (2025)	Position
Canadian Albums (Billboard)	28
US Billboard 200	44
US Top Country Albums (Billboard)	9
US Top Rock & Alternative Albums (Billboard)	8

== Certifications ==
Certifications for The Great American Bar Scene
Region	Certification	Certified units/sales
Canada (Music Canada)	3× Platinum	240,000^{‡}
New Zealand (RMNZ)	Platinum	15,000^{‡}
United Kingdom (BPI)	Gold	100,000^{‡}
United States (RIAA)	Platinum	1,000,000^{‡}
^{‡} Sales+streaming figures based on certification alone.
