= Pink Skies =

Single by Zach Bryan

from the album The Great American Bar Scene
- Released: May 24, 2024
- Genre: Country
- Length: 3:49 (album version); 3:15 (single version)
- Label: Belting Bronco; Warner
- Songwriter: Zach Bryan
- Producer: Zach Bryan

Zach Bryan singles chronology
"I Remember Everything" (2023)	"Pink Skies" (2024)	"This World's a Giant" (2024)

"Pink Skies" is a song by American singer Zach Bryan. It was released on May 24, 2024, as the lead single from his fifth studio album, The Great American Bar Scene.

== Release and promotion ==
Zach Bryan announced the release of "Pink Skies" on May 24, 2024. He announced it via Twitter as the lead single to an upcoming album titled The Great American Bar Scene.

Bryan performed the song live for the first time at the Oakland Coliseum on June 1, 2024.

== Composition ==
Casey Young of Whiskey Riff wrote that the song "touches on the feelings of grief and loss that comes with missing a person you love, and many on social media have quickly taken to the song and expressed that Zach was able to perfectly capture what they might not have been able to put into words themselves." According to Bryan, the song was not inspired by any individual moment in his life, but rather in his interest in family dynamics. Lyrically, it is about a family gathering to hold a funeral for one of their members.

== Commercial performance ==
Upon release, "Pink Skies" charted at number six on the Billboard Hot 100. Bryan initially expressed frustration that the label had seemingly serviced the song to pop radio without his knowledge, but Whiskey Riff later reported that the label had not actually done so.

== Charts ==
=== Weekly charts ===
Weekly chart performance for "Pink Skies"
Chart (2024–2025)	Peak position
Australia (ARIA)	12
Canada Hot 100 (Billboard)	7
Global 200 (Billboard)	16
Ireland (IRMA)	7
New Zealand (Recorded Music NZ)	18
Sweden (Sverigetopplistan)	63
UK Singles (Official Charts)	25
US Billboard Hot 100	6
US Hot Country Songs (Billboard)	3
US Hot Rock & Alternative Songs (Billboard)	1

=== Year-end charts ===
2024 year-end chart performance for "Pink Skies"
Chart (2024)	Position
Australia (ARIA)	42
Canada (Canadian Hot 100)	24
Global 200 (Billboard)	125
US Billboard Hot 100	30
US Hot Country Songs (Billboard)	9
US Hot Rock & Alternative Songs (Billboard)	5

2025 year-end chart performance for "Pink Skies"
Chart (2025)	Position
Australia (ARIA)	41
US Hot Country Songs (Billboard)	81
US Hot Rock & Alternative Songs (Billboard)	11

== Certifications ==
Certifications for "Pink Skies"
Region	Certification	Certified units/sales
Australia (ARIA)	5× Platinum	350,000^{‡}
Canada (Music Canada)	9× Platinum	720,000^{‡}
New Zealand (RMNZ)	3× Platinum	90,000^{‡}
United Kingdom (BPI)	Platinum	600,000^{‡}
United States (RIAA)	5× Platinum	5,000,000^{‡}
^{‡} Sales+streaming figures based on certification alone.
