= Something in the Orange =

Single by Zach Bryan

from the album American Heartbreak
- Released: April 22, 2022
- Genre: Country
- Length: 3:48 (single version); 4:14 (Z&E's version)
- Label: Warner
- Songwriter: Zach Bryan
- Producer: Ryan Hadlock

Zach Bryan singles chronology
"Highway Boys" (2022)	"Something in the Orange" (2022)	"Burn, Burn, Burn" (2022)

"Something in the Orange" is a song written and recorded by American singer Zach Bryan. It was released on April 22, 2022, as the second single from his third studio album American Heartbreak. Ryan Hadlock produced the single at Bear Creek Studio. A second version titled "Z&E's version" was later produced by Eddie Spear.

It was nominated for Best Country Solo Performance at the 65th Annual Grammy Awards.

== Content ==
Zach Bryan told Today's Country Radio with Kelleigh Bannen that he wrote the song "in a cabin in Wisconsin." Bryan released two versions of the song: the original single version and a completely different recording which features a more stripped back arrangement. He had first released snippets of the song via social media in December 2021. Bryan also released a music video for the song containing "crowd sourced footage shot by fans" that "captures the raw and unfiltered emotion" of the song experience.

== Critical reception ==
The New York Times wrote that the song "has become his most recognizable hit since his early songs." Rolling Stone editors described "Z&E's version" as "a heartbreaking single full of the genre's signature soul, stripped down to only an acoustic guitar and a harmonica." BroadwayWorld described the song as "Bryan laying himself bare, willing himself to believe there's a chance of survival for an all-but-doomed relationship."

== Chart performance ==
"Something in the Orange" is Bryan's first entry on the Billboard Hot 100, debuting on the chart dated May 7, 2022, and later peaking at number 10.

The release of "Something in the Orange" led Bryan to take the number one position on the Billboard Top Songwriters chart in mid-2022.

The single was officially serviced to mainstream country radio on October 3, 2022.

== Covers ==
Niall Horan covered the song in June 2023 as part of the Live @ SiriusXM Series.

Our Last Night covered the song in October 2023

== Charts ==
=== Weekly charts ===
Weekly chart performance for "Something in the Orange"
Chart (2022–2024)	Peak position
Australia (ARIA)	6
Canada Hot 100 (Billboard)	14
Canada Country (Billboard)	28
Global 200 (Billboard)	23
Ireland (IRMA)	7
New Zealand (Recorded Music NZ)	9
Sweden (Sverigetopplistan)	50
UK Singles (Official Charts)	70
US Billboard Hot 100	10
US Country Airplay (Billboard)	20
US Hot Country Songs (Billboard)	1
US Hot Rock & Alternative Songs (Billboard)	1

Weekly chart performance for "Something in the Orange"
Chart (2026)	Peak position
Norway (IFPI Norge)	72

=== Year-end charts ===
2022 year-end chart performance for "Something in the Orange"
Chart (2022)	Position
Australia (ARIA)	66
Canada (Canadian Hot 100)	51
Global 200 (Billboard)	130
US Billboard Hot 100	39
US Hot Country Songs (Billboard)	6
US Hot Rock & Alternative Songs (Billboard)	7

2023 year-end chart performance for "Something in the Orange"
Chart (2023)	Position
Australia (ARIA)	7
Canada (Canadian Hot 100)	15
Global 200 (Billboard)	28
New Zealand (Recorded Music NZ)	8
US Billboard Hot 100	13
US Country Airplay (Billboard)	55
US Hot Country Songs (Billboard)	4
US Hot Rock & Alternative Songs (Billboard)	1

2024 year-end chart performance for "Something in the Orange"
Chart (2024)	Position
Australia (ARIA)	15
Global 200 (Billboard)	42
New Zealand (Recorded Music NZ)	17
UK Singles (OCC)	92

2025 year-end chart performance for "Something in the Orange"
Chart (2025)	Position
Australia (ARIA)	58
Global 200 (Billboard)	159

== Certifications ==
Certifications for "Something in the Orange"
Region	Certification	Certified units/sales
Australia (ARIA)	8× Platinum	560,000^{‡}
Canada (Music Canada)	Diamond	800,000^{‡}
Denmark (IFPI Danmark)	Gold	45,000^{‡}
New Zealand (RMNZ)	8× Platinum	240,000^{‡}
United Kingdom (BPI)	2× Platinum	1,200,000^{‡}
United States (RIAA)	15× Platinum	15,000,000^{‡}
^{‡} Sales+streaming figures based on certification alone.
