= Zach Bryan =

American singer-songwriter (born 1996)

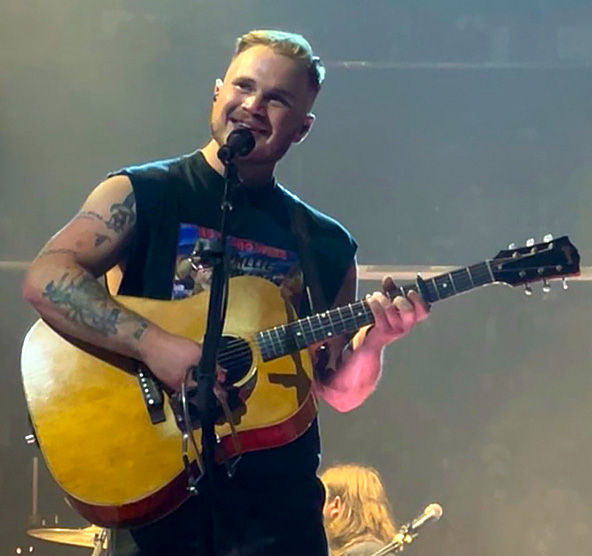
- Bryan performing at Crypto.com Arena in 2023

Background information
- Born: Zachary Lane Bryan; April 2, 1996 (age 30); Yokosuka, Japan
- Origin: Oologah, Oklahoma, U.S.
- Genres: Country; alternative country; Americana; honky-tonk; red dirt
- Occupation: Singer-songwriter
- Instruments: Vocals; guitar; harmonica
- Years active: 2017–present
- Labels: Warner; Belting Bronco
- Spouse: Rose Madden (m. 2020; div. 2021) Samantha Leonard (m. 2025)
- Website: www.zachbryan.com
- Military career
- Allegiance: United States
- Branch: United States Navy
- Service years: 2013–2021
- Rank: Petty Officer Second Class

Zachary Lane Bryan (born April 2, 1996) is an American singer-songwriter. Born in Yokosuka, Japan, and raised in Oologah, Oklahoma, he released two self-produced studio albums, DeAnn (2019) and Elisabeth (2020), before signing with Warner Records to release his third album and major label debut American Heartbreak (2022), which peaked at number five on the Billboard 200 and was led by the Billboard Hot 100-top ten single "Something in the Orange". His self-titled fourth album (2023) debuted atop the Billboard 200, while its lead single, "I Remember Everything" (featuring Kacey Musgraves), peaked atop the Billboard Hot 100, Hot Country Songs, and Hot Rock & Alternative Songs charts simultaneously, also earning him a Grammy Award for Best Country Duo/Group Performance. His fifth studio album, The Great American Bar Scene (2024), peaked at number two on the Billboard 200, and his sixth, With Heaven on Top (2026), debuted at number one.

Throughout his career, Bryan has won several awards, including an Academy of Country Music Award, a Grammy Award and four Billboard Music Awards. He has sold over 30 million albums and singles, according to the RIAA.

== Early life ==
Bryan was born in Yokosuka, Japan, where his parents were stationed as part of a U.S. Navy deployment. He is the son of Dewayne Bryan and Annette DeAnn (née Mullen) Bryan, and has a sister, Mackenzie. DeAnn battled alcohol abuse. When Bryan was in the eighth grade, his family moved to Oologah, Oklahoma. His parents divorced when he was 12. He started writing songs at the age of 14.

Continuing a family tradition, Bryan was an active-duty member of the United States Navy for eight years, enlisting at the age of 17. Bryan attained the rate/rating of Aviation Ordnanceman Second Class (AO2). He used his spare time while in the Navy to write music for his enjoyment. He finished his service in the Navy in 2021 at the age of 25 to pursue his career in music.

== Career ==
=== 2017–2020: Beginnings, DeAnn and Elisabeth ===
Bryan started uploading his music to YouTube in 2017, with his friends recording him performing using his iPhone. Bryan's first song uploaded to YouTube was the single "God Speed" which ended up being a track on his debut album. Many of the songs Bryan would upload to his YouTube were written and recorded by him while serving in the Navy. Bryan uploaded 16 songs of varying popularity onto his YouTube channel before "Heading South" went viral. The song was recorded outside his Navy barracks.

His debut album, DeAnn, was dedicated to his late mother and released on August 24, 2019. It was written in two months and recorded with his friends in an Airbnb located in Jacksonville, Florida. The album consisted of 12 tracks, many of which had been previously uploaded to his YouTube. Bryan's first public concert was in Medford, Oregon, in October 2019. He has since made his debut at the historic Ryman Auditorium, among other noteworthy appearances. A second album, Elisabeth, was released on May 8, 2020. He recorded the album in a repurposed barn behind his home in Washington. The album is named after his wife at the time (div. 2021). The album contains 19 tracks, including the tracks "Heading South" and "Revival". Bryan released his first EP, Quiet, Heavy Dreams, on November 27, 2020.

=== 2021–2023: American Heartbreak and Zach Bryan ===
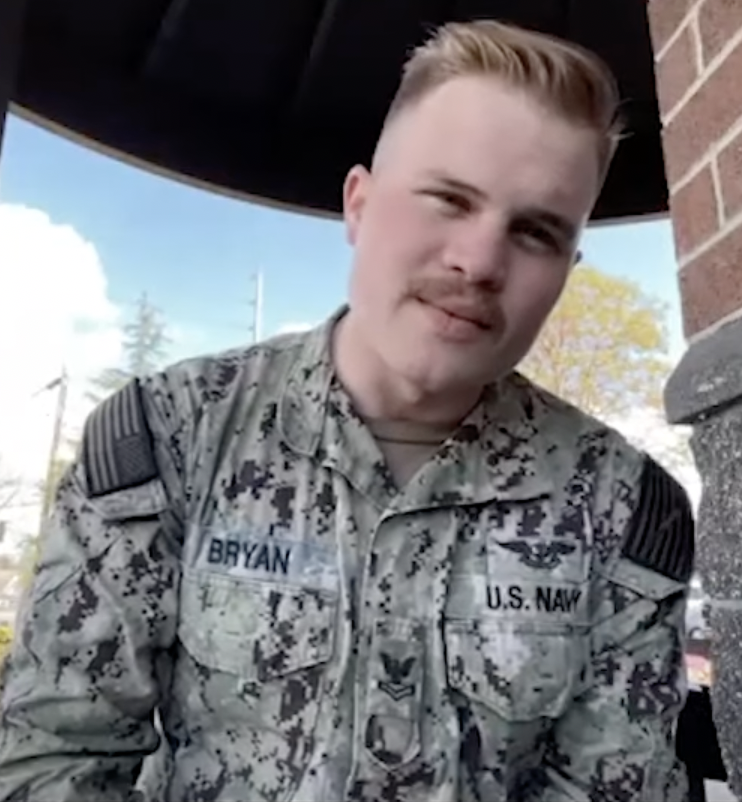
Bryan while in the Navy, 2021

On April 10, 2021, Bryan made his Grand Ole Opry debut. He later signed a deal with Warner Records to release his music. On October 14, 2021, Bryan announced that he was honorably discharged from the U.S. Navy after eight years of service to pursue his career in music just ahead of his nationwide Fall 2021 "Ain't For Tamin' Tour". He said, "If it was my decision, I would never get out of the world's greatest Navy, but here I am and they kindly honorably discharged me to go play some music."

On January 25, 2022, Bryan announced that he would release his major-label debut, a triple album, American Heartbreak, on May 20, 2022. On April 22, 2022, Bryan released the hit single "Something in the Orange", which became a mainstream hit and is regarded as one of Bryan's most recognizable and identifiable songs. The song was Bryan's breakthrough onto the Billboard Hot 100 debuting at position 55 on May 7, 2022, and peaking at 10. American Heartbreak debuted at number five on the U.S. Billboard 200 with over 70,000 album-equivalent units, marking the biggest first week for a country album in 2022. The album consisted of 34 tracks including "Something in the Orange – Z&E's Version" a more raw and acoustic version of the hit song.

On July 15, 2022, Bryan released his second EP, Summertime Blues, which featured collaborator Charles Wesley Godwin. The EP contained nine tracks including the charting song of "Oklahoma Smokeshow" which peaked at number 75. On September 8, 2022, Bryan released the single "Burn, Burn, Burn" followed by the single "Starved" on October 10. These were followed by the two singles "Fifth of May" and "The Greatest Day of My Life" on November 11, 2022. On December 25, 2022, he released a live album called All My Homies Hate Ticketmaster (Live from Red Rocks), recorded at Red Rocks Amphitheatre. Bryan's single "Something In The Orange" was nominated for Best Country Solo Performance at the 65th Annual Grammy Awards marking Bryan's first career Grammy Awards nomination.

On January 27, 2023, Bryan collaborated with Maggie Rogers and released "Dawns", his first single of the year. The single reached a peak of 42 on the Billboard Hot 100. In May 2023, Bryan received the Academy of Country Music Award for New Male Artist of the Year. On August 25, 2023, Bryan released his self-titled fourth album. It debuted at number one on the Billboard 200. The album also contained Bryan's first number one single, "I Remember Everything", featuring Kacey Musgraves, which debuted on the Billboard Hot 100 at the top spot. All sixteen tracks of the album charted on the Billboard Hot 100 with "I Remember Everything", "Hey Driver" (featuring The War and Treaty), "Spotless" (featuring The Lumineers), "East Side of Sorrow", and "Tourniquet" all appearing in the top 20.

On September 22, 2023, he released his third EP, Boys of Faith, which included songs featuring fellow artists Noah Kahan and Bon Iver. All five tracks on the EP charted on the Billboard Hot 100 with "Sarah's Place" featuring Kahan peaking at 14. Bryan was named Billboard's top new artist of 2023 for his increased popularity through the year, such as his first appearance at the top of both the Billboard 200 and Billboard Hot 100. At the 66th Annual Grammy Awards, Bryan was nominated for three categories. His self-titled fourth album was nominated for Best Country Album. "I Remember Everything" featuring Musgraves was nominated for the Best Country Song. The song was also nominated and won the Best Country Duo/Group Performance marking Bryan's first Grammy award win of his career.

=== 2024–present: The Great American Bar Scene and With Heaven on Top ===
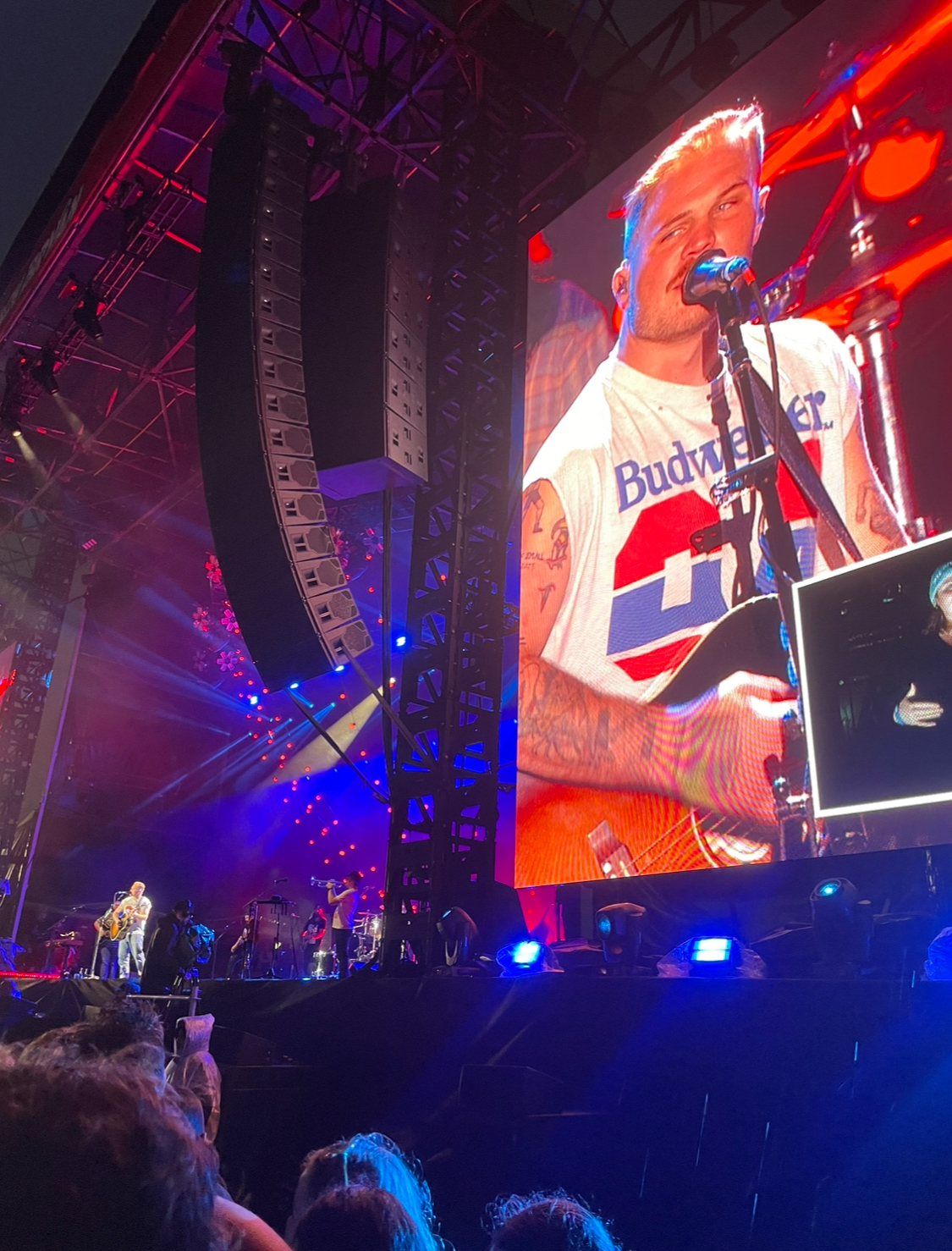
Bryan performing at Flemington Racecourse, Melbourne, Australia in 2023

In early 2024, Bryan began teasing and announcing his fifth studio album, The Great American Bar Scene. On May 24, 2024, Bryan released the lead single from the album, "Pink Skies". The single would debut at number 6 on the Billboard Hot 100, becoming the second highest charting single of his career up until this point. Bryan released the second single from the album titled "Purple Gas" which featured Noeline Hofmann, on June 7. The album was released on July 4, 2024. It contains 19 tracks including songs featuring artists Noeline Hofmann, John Moreland, John Mayer, Bruce Springsteen, and Watchhouse.

In early November 2024, following his breakup with Barstool Sports podcaster Brianna LaPaglia, Bryan released two songs, "High Road" and "This World's a Giant". Both songs were commercial successes; "High Road" peaked at number 28 in Canada and number 29 in the US and Ireland, while "This World's a Giant" peaked at number 32 in Ireland, number 41 in Canada, and number 49 in the US. On December 20, 2024, roughly two years after he released All My Homies Hate Ticketmaster (Live from Red Rocks), Bryan released 24 (Live), a compilation live album recorded during his 2024 Quittin' Time Tour.

After the NFC divisional playoff game between the Philadelphia Eagles and the Los Angeles Rams on January 19, 2025, which the Eagles won, Bryan announced he would release a new song, "Blue Jean Baby", if the Eagles won the 2025 NFC Championship on January 26; the Eagles beat the Washington Commanders 55–23. "Blue Jean Baby" was released at midnight on January 27. In an Instagram post announcing the release of the song, Bryan promised to release an EP and an album by the end of the year. He headlined Stagecoach Festival on April 25, 2025. On July 2, he released the songs "Streets of London", "River Washed Hair", and "A Song For You" as a three-song single. On July 18, he collaborated with Gabriella Rose and released “Madeline”. He released “Bowery”, a collaboration with Kings of Leon, on August 8.

On September 27, 2025, Bryan performed a concert at Michigan Stadium in Ann Arbor, Michigan, breaking the record for the largest attendance at a ticketed concert by a single headlining act in the United States. He played to an announced crowd of 112,408. It was only the second concert in the 98-year history of the venue, and the first by a headlining act. He broke the previous record set by George Strait on June 15, 2024, when Strait played a concert at Kyle Field at Texas A&M University in College Station, Texas, to 110,905 fans in attendance.

On January 9, 2026, Bryan released his sixth studio album, With Heaven on Top, which debuted atop the Billboard 200 making this his second album to peak at number 1 on the chart. Three days later Bryan released a stripped-back, acoustic version of the album. On October 15, 2026, Bryan released his fifth EP, Young Manhood and Other Donatable Organs, which includes the collaboration "Lies" with American singer Lana Del Rey.

== Personal life ==
In 2013, Bryan enlisted in the U.S. Navy. He served as an Aviation Ordnanceman in Florida as well as Washington, and served tours in Bahrain and Djibouti before receiving an honorable discharge to pursue his musical career. Bryan's mother died in 2016.

On September 7, 2023, he was arrested by the Oklahoma Highway Patrol for obstruction in Vinita, Oklahoma, and released on bail.

Bryan completed his bachelor's degree in psychology in the fall of 2023 while touring and creating an album, fulfilling a promise made to his late mother.

In 2025, Bryan purchased the former Saint Jean Baptiste Church in Lowell, Massachusetts to enable The Jack Kerouac Foundation to build a museum to honor the novelist and poet. Bryan has cited Kerouac's works as an important influence in his life.

In 2026 Bryan bought the original manuscript of Jack Kerouac's On the Road at auction.

=== Relationships ===
Bryan married Rose Madden in July 2020; the pair dissolved their marriage in 2021. Bryan was in a relationship with Deb Peifer from 2022 until May 2023.

He started dating Brianna LaPaglia, co-host of the BFFs podcast published by Barstool Sports, in July 2023. Bryan announced his breakup with LaPaglia on October 22, 2024, via an Instagram Story. LaPaglia was blindsided by the breakup, as she shared in a story on her own Instagram. She later claimed Bryan blocked her after the breakup, and that he emotionally abused her and offered her $12 million to sign a non-disclosure agreement after the breakup. In response to the breakup with LaPaglia, BFFs co-hosts Dave Portnoy and Josh Richards released a song about Bryan titled "Smallest Man", which was subsequently removed from several platforms due to takedown requests from Bryan and Richards' label Warner Music Group.

In December 2025, he married Samantha Leonard.

== Activism and political views ==
In October 2025, Bryan posted a snippet of a recording of a song called "Bad News" with lyrics apparently critical of the tactics used by ICE agents deployed in cities around the country. Supporters of the Donald Trump administration were reportedly displeased with the song. Bryan later related a statement through social media saying the intention of the song had been "misconstrued". Among the ensuing controversy, Bryan has attempted to explain that the song had not intended to be partisan or "take sides".

Bryan wore a shirt with "Free Palestine", a pine tree, and "An appeal to heaven" on it during performances at Gillette Stadium in October 2026. Members of his band also wore pro-Palestine shirts. The Boston Herald interpreted the shirt as a protest against stadium owner Robert Kraft, who a few weeks earlier contributed to Macklemore being removed from Ed Sheeran's tour due to his pro-Palestine speeches at concerts.

== Discography ==
- DeAnn (2019)
- Elisabeth (2020)
- American Heartbreak (2022)
- Zach Bryan (2023)
- The Great American Bar Scene (2024)
- With Heaven on Top (2026)

== Tours ==
Headlining

- The American Heartbreak Tour (2022)
- The Burn Burn Burn Tour (2023)
- The Quittin' Time Tour (2024-2025)
- With Heaven on Tour (2026)

== Filmography ==
Television roles
Year	Title	Role	Notes
2022	Yellowstone	Himself	Episode: "The Dream Is Not Me"

== Awards and nominations ==
Organizations	Year	Category	Work	Result	Ref.
American Music Awards	2026	Best Rock/Alternative Album	"With Heaven on Top"	Pending	
Berlin Music Video Awards	2024	Best Narrative	"Nine Ball"	Nominated	
Billboard Music Awards	2023	Top New Artist	Himself	Won	
Billboard Music Awards	2023	Top Male Artist	Himself	Nominated	
Billboard Music Awards	2023	Top Hot 100 Songwriter	Himself	Nominated	
Billboard Music Awards	2023	Top Hot 100 Producer	Himself	Nominated	
Billboard Music Awards	2023	Top Streaming Songs Artist	Himself	Nominated	
Billboard Music Awards	2023	Top Country Artist	Himself	Nominated	
Billboard Music Awards	2023	Top Male Country Artist	Himself	Nominated	
Billboard Music Awards	2023	Top Rock Artist	Himself	Won	
Billboard Music Awards	2023	Top Country Album	American Heartbreak	Nominated	
Billboard Music Awards	2023	Top Rock Album	American Heartbreak	Won	
Billboard Music Awards	2023	Top Streaming Song	"Something in the Orange"	Nominated	
Billboard Music Awards	2023	Top Country Song	"Something in the Orange"	Nominated	
Billboard Music Awards	2023	Top Rock Song	"Something in the Orange"	Won	
Billboard Music Awards	2023	Top Rock Song	"I Remember Everything"	Nominated	
Academy of Country Music Awards	2023	New Male Artist of the Year	Himself	Won	
Academy of Country Music Awards	2024	Artist-Songwriter of the Year	Himself	Nominated	
Academy of Country Music Awards	2024	Music Event of the Year	"I Remember Everything"	Nominated	
Country Music Association Awards	2023	New Artist of the Year	Himself	Nominated	
Country Music Association Awards	2024	Musical Event of the Year	"I Remember Everything"	Nominated	
CMT Music Awards	2024	Male Breakthrough Video of the Year	"Oklahoma Smokeshow"	Nominated	
Grammy Awards	2023	Best Country Solo Performance	"Something in the Orange"	Nominated	
Grammy Awards	2024	Best Country Album	Zach Bryan	Nominated	
Grammy Awards	2024	Best Country Song	"I Remember Everything"	Nominated	
Grammy Awards	2024	Best Country Duo/Group Performance	"I Remember Everything"	Won	
People's Choice Awards	2024	The Male Country Artist of the Year	Himself	Nominated	
People's Choice Awards	2024	The Collaboration Song of the Year	"I Remember Everything"	Nominated	
People's Choice Country Awards	2023	The People's Artist of the Year	Himself	Nominated	
People's Choice Country Awards	2023	The Male Artist of the Year	Himself	Nominated	
People's Choice Country Awards	2023	The New Artist of the Year	Himself	Nominated	
People's Choice Country Awards	2023	The Crossover Song of the Year	"Dawns"	Nominated	
People's Choice Country Awards	2023	The Concert Tour of the Year	The Burn, Burn, Burn Tour	Nominated	
People's Choice Country Awards	2024	The People's Artist of the Year	Himself	Nominated	
People's Choice Country Awards	2024	The Male Artist of the Year	Himself	Nominated	
People's Choice Country Awards	2024	The Male Song of the Year	"Pink Skies"	Nominated	
People's Choice Country Awards	2024	The Storyteller Song of the Year	"Pink Skies"	Nominated	
People's Choice Country Awards	2024	The Song of the Year	"Pink Skies"	Nominated	
People's Choice Country Awards	2024	The Song of the Year	"I Remember Everything" (with Kacey Musgraves)	Nominated	
People's Choice Country Awards	2024	The Collaboration Song of the Year	"I Remember Everything" (with Kacey Musgraves)	Won	
People's Choice Country Awards	2024	The Collaboration Song of the Year	"Hey Driver"	Nominated	
People's Choice Country Awards	2024	The Crossover Song of the Year	"Better Days" (with John Mayer)	Nominated	
People's Choice Country Awards	2024	The Album of the Year	Zach Bryan	Nominated	
People's Choice Country Awards	2024	The Concert Tour of the Year	The Quittin Time 2024 Tour	Nominated	
