= Gruene Hall =

- U.S. Historic district – Contributing property
- Recorded Texas Historic Landmark
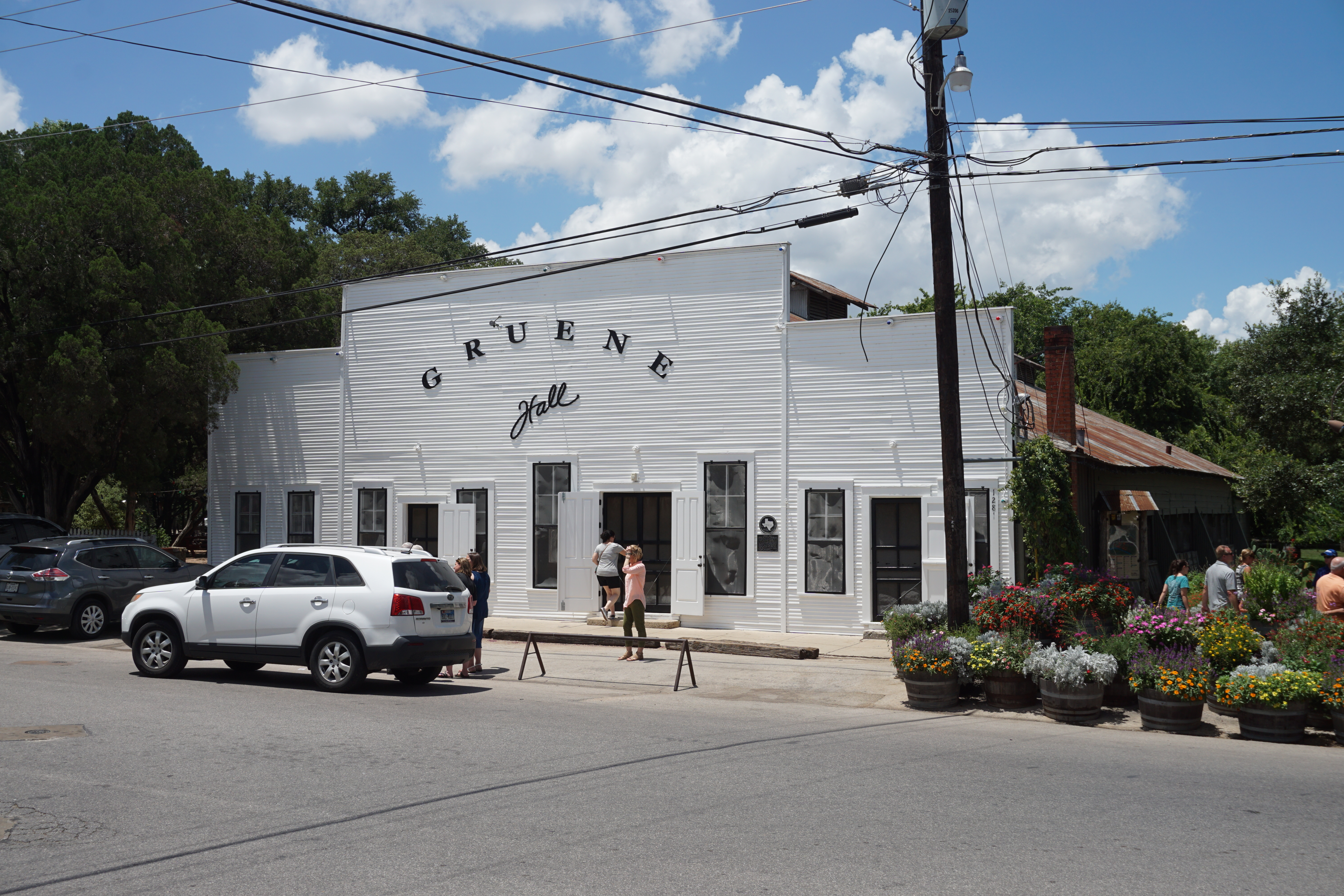
- Gruene Hall in 2017
- Location: Gruene, Texas
- Coordinates: 29°44′18″N 98°6′16″W
- Built: 1878
- Built by: Christian Herry
- Architect: H.D. Gruene
- Part of: Gruene Historic District (ID75001962)
- RTHL No.: 2296

Significant dates
- Designated CP: April 21, 1975
- Designated RTHL: 1988

Gruene Hall, built in 1878 by Henry (Heinrich) D. Gruene and located in the historical town of Gruene, Texas (now a part of New Braunfels), bills itself as "the oldest continually run dance hall in Texas". By design, not much has physically changed since the hall was first built. The 6,000-square-foot (560 m^{2}) dance hall with a high-pitched tin roof still has the original layout with side flaps for open-air dancing, a bar in the front, a small lighted stage in the back, and a huge outdoor garden. Advertisement signs from the 1930s and 1940s still hang in the old hall and around the stage.

== Films and photography ==
In 1996, the hall was used as a set for Michael, starring John Travolta.

In 2006, Gruene Hall was shown in the movie Coyote Funeral.

In 2009, George Strait's album Twang CD cover and insert photos were taken at Gruene Hall.

In 2019, ZZ Top did interviews and played live music for many parts of the documentary That Little ol' Band from Texas at the dance hall. At the end of the documentary, they walk out to the front of the dance hall in Gruene, with a clear view of some of the town, and drive off together into the horizon.

In 2021, Gruene Hall was featured in an episode of the TV show Landmarks: The Stages of Country Music (S01 E02).

== Album and music video recordings ==
In 1989, Jerry Jeff Walker recorded his live album Jerry Jeff Walker – Live At Gruene Hall.

In 1994, Wade Hayes shot his country music video "Old Enough to Know Better" at Gruene Hall.

On November 16, 2016, George Strait gave a private surprise show at Gruene Hall, to perform a nearly two hour set in celebration of his then new album, Strait Out of the Box: Part 2.

On February 16, 2019, LeAnn Rimes recorded Rimes: Live at Gruene Hall during a live concert at Gruene Hall, which was released on April 13, 2019.

In 2022, Scotty McCreery filmed his music video "Damn Strait" at Gruene Hall. It holds a special meaning to McCreery since he is a George Strait fan and its the venue is where George Strait started and where he got his record deal which launched his career. After the video was released George Strait gave it his approval. The song turned out to be a #1 on Country Radio for McCreery.

== List of past performers ==
- Aaron Neville
- Aaron Watson
- Albert Collins
- Arlo Guthrie
- Asleep at the Wheel
- Augie Meyers
- B. B. King
- Billy Joe Shaver
- Bo Diddley
- Boz Scaggs
- Bruce Robison
- Buddy Guy
- Charley Crockett
- Casey Donahew
- Charlie Daniels
- Charlie Pride
- Charlie Robison
- Chris Isaak
- Clint Black
- Colter Wall
- Cory Morrow
- David Allan Coe
- David Ball
- Delbert McClinton
- Dennis Quaid and the Sharks
- Dierks Bentley
- Doug Sahm
- Doug Supernaw
- Dixie Chicks
- Dwight Yoakam
- Eli Young Band
- Emilio Navaira
- Emmylou Harris
- Ernest Tubb
- Fabulous Thunderbirds
- Flaco Jimenez
- Garth Brooks
- Gatemouth Brown
- George Strait
- Gregg Allman
- Guy Clark
- Hal Ketchum
- Hootie and the Blowfish
- Jack Ingram
- Jake Worthington
- Jason Boland & The Stragglers
- Jerry Jeff Walker
- Jerry Lee Lewis
- Jimmie Dale Gilmore
- Joe Ely
- John Hiatt
- Josh Abbott Band
- John Michael Montgomery
- John Prine
- Johnny Bush
- Junior Brown
- Kacey Musgraves
- Keb Mo
- Kentucky Thunder
- Kevin Costner & Modern West
- Kevin Fowler
- Koko Taylor
- Kris Kristofferson
- LeAnn Rimes
- Lee Ann Womack
- Lee Roy Parnell
- Leon Russell
- Levon Helm
- Little Feat
- Little Richard
- Loretta Lynn
- Los Lobos
- Los Lonely Boys
- Los Texmaniacs
- The Lowdown Drifters
- Lyle Lovett
- Lucinda Williams
- Mark Chesnutt
- The Marshall Tucker Band
- Marty Stuart
- The Mavericks
- Mel Tillis
- Melissa Etheridge
- Merle Haggard
- Michael Martin Murphey
- Mike and the Moonpies
- Midland
- Miranda Lambert
- Nanci Griffith
- Nitty Gritty Dirt Band
- Pat Benatar
- Pat Green
- Patty Griffin
- The Peterson Brothers
- Poco
- Pure Prairie League
- Radney Foster
- Randall King
- Randy Rogers Band
- Randy Travis
- Raul Malo
- Ray Price
- Ray Wylie Hubbard
- Reckless Kelly
- Ricky Skaggs
- Robert Earl Keen
- Rodney Crowell
- Roger Creager
- Ronnie Milsap
- Ryan Bingham
- Scotty McCreery
- Steve Earle
- Taj Mahal
- Tanya Tucker
- Texas Tornados
- Travis Tritt
- Three Dog Night
- Trombone Shorty
- Todd Rundgren
- Townes Van Zandt
- Turnpike Troubadours
- Tyler Halverson
- Vandoliers
- Wade Hayes
- The Wallflowers
- Wayne Toups
- Willie Nelson
- Wynonna Judd
- Ziggy Marley
- ZZ Top

== See also ==
- National Register of Historic Places listings in Comal County, Texas
- Recorded Texas Historic Landmarks in Comal County

== Bibliography ==
- Gilliam, Luke (2008). Pat Green's Dance Halls and Dreamers. ISBN 978-0-292-71876-0.
- Folkins, Gail (2007). Texas Dance Halls: A Two Step Circuit. ISBN 978-0-89672-603-1.
- Vokac, David; Vokac, Joan (2009). The Great Towns of America. ISBN 978-0-930743-10-9.
- Schultz, Patricia (2012). 1000 Places to See Before You Die. ISBN 978-0-7611-5686-4.
