= The Lowdown Drifters =

American country rock band

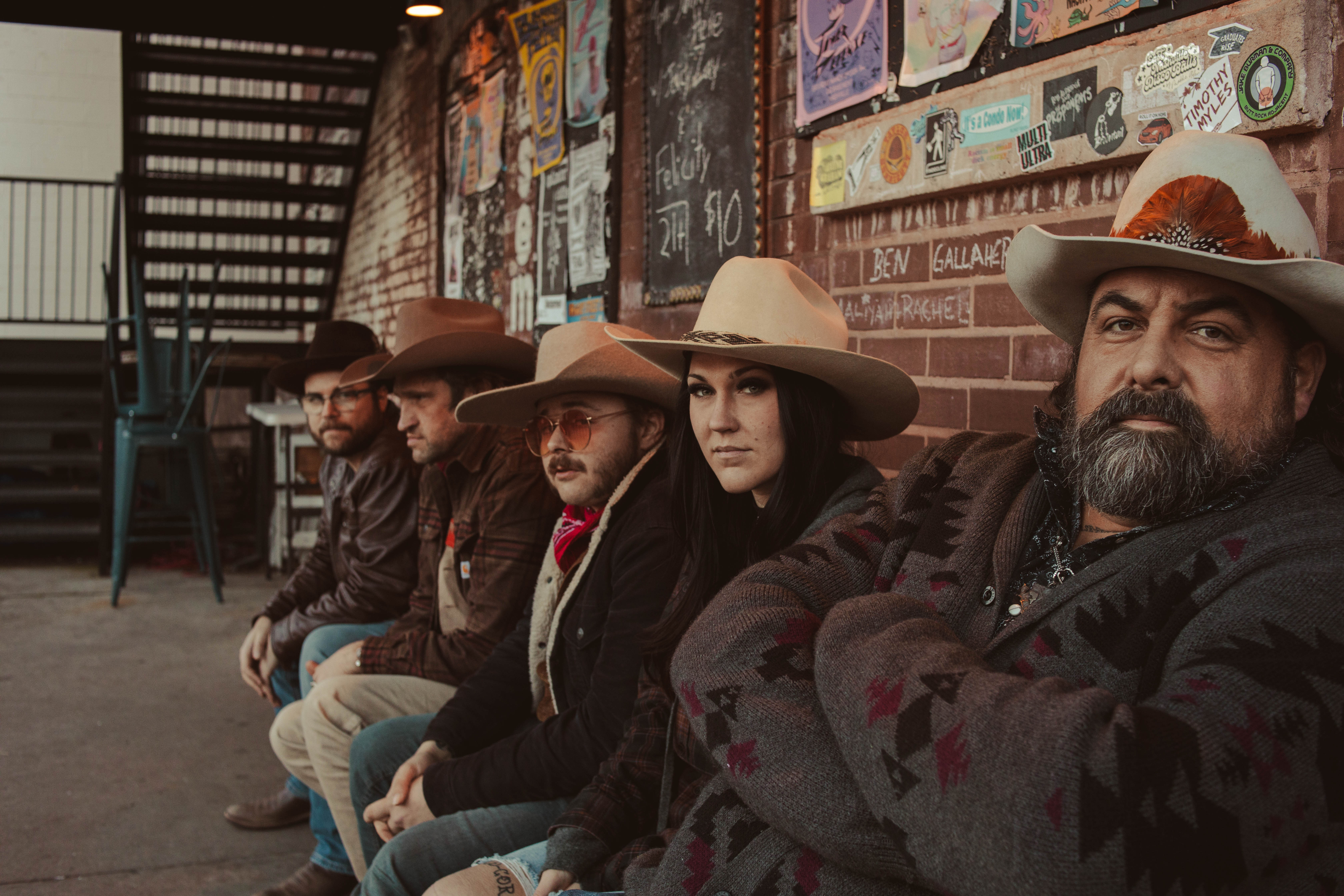
The Lowdown Drifters (Front to back: Big John Cannon, Raina Wallace, Dylan Welsh, Doug Rehfeldt, Josh Willaert)

The Lowdown Drifters are an American country rock band based in Fort Worth, Texas. The band was originally formed in the Pacific Northwest in 2015 by singer-songwriters Big John Cannon and Ryan Klein.

The band's style has been described as "a Texas-based band blending country, rock, and Americana" or "a rock band with a fiddle problem".

The Lowdown Drifters are signed to The Kirby Organization for national booking representation.

== Biography ==
=== Wood and Water (2015–2017) ===
The band formed in Stanwood, Washington when founding members Big John Cannon and Ryan Klein, who were in the bands Trainwreck and Junior Jones Band, played their final shows together in 2015. They built a following performing at venues in and around Seattle leading up to their 2016 debut EP, Wood & Water. With an album release show at the Hard Rock Cafe.

=== Last Call For Dreamers (2018–2019) ===
In 2018, the band opened for Shane Smith and The Saints at The Tractor Tavern, in Seattle, WA. Later that year, they played Wild Hare Music Festival in Canby, Oregon along with Randy Rogers Band, Parker McCollum, and Sunny Sweeney.

In spring of 2019, the band self released their first LP, Last Call For Dreamers, with Nashville producer Malcolm Springer. The album features the song, "Fire In Her Eyes", the band's most streamed song to date. The single, "Won't Find Me Anymore" charted at No. 60 on MusicRow radio.

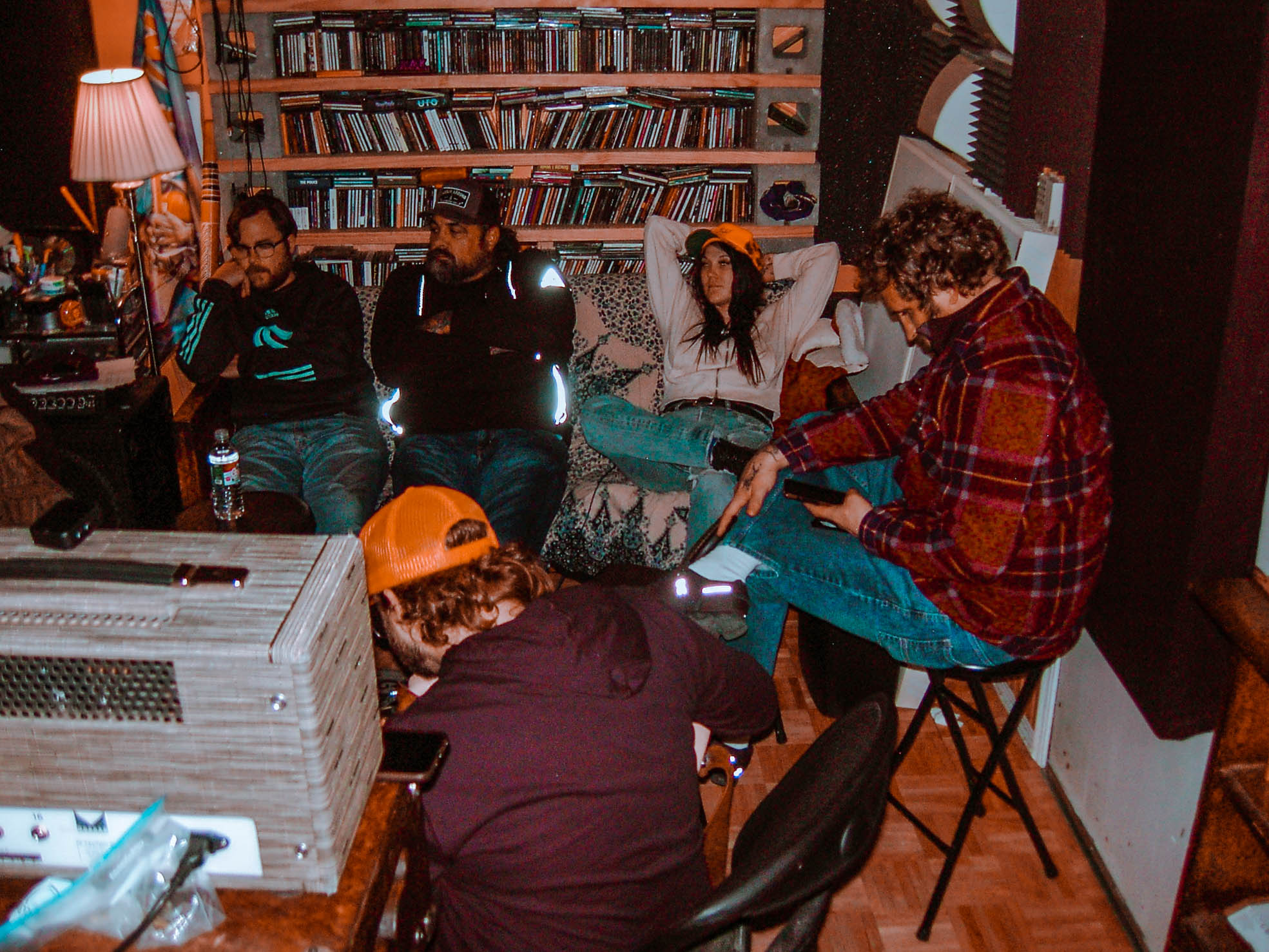
The Lowdown Drifters in 115 Recording Studio.

The band's line up at this time consisted of: Big John Cannon (Vocals, Guitar), Ryan Klein (Guitar, Vocals), Richard Williams (Guitar, Vocals), Tim Fernley (Bass), and Galen Bailey (Drums). Later that year, they were featured on an episode of Band In Seattle.

=== Singles and with a Little Help From My Friends (2020–2021) ===
In early 2020, the band went to Modern Electric Sound Recorders studio in Dallas, TX with producer Tim Lightyear (previously of Shane Smith and The Saints) with musicians Ben Hussey (American Aquarium, Dolly Shine), Drew Harakal (Cody Jinks) and Jan Fleming (Ian Moore, Ulrich Ellison) and Jene Fleenore. The session resulted in 6 singles released across 2020 – "If I Had A Dollar", "Alright", "Hammer Down", "Headstone", "Ballad of the Reef Shadow". Throughout the year the band experienced lineup changes, adding Dylan Welsh (Lead Guitar), Josh Willaert (Drums) and Doug Rehfeldt (Fiddle). Later that year, they performed at the Hwy 30 Music Festival with Koe Wetzel, Sam Riggs, and Ray Wylie Hubbard.

In 2021, the band recorded "With A Little Help From My Friends" with producer Tim Allen in Seattle. The EP features re-worked Lowdown Drifters songs, "Fire In Her Eyes" (featuring Taylor Hunnicutt) and "Alright"; as well as covers of "Malt Liquor" by Hellbound Glory (featuring Leroy Virgil of Hellbound Glory) and "Instead We Sang" by Dalton Domino (featuring Dalton Domino). Later that year, the band played shows with Micky & the Motorcars at Gruene Hall, and Zach Bryan at The Pageant in St. Louis.

=== Cheating on a Memory (2022–2023) ===
In 2022, Raina Wallace joined The Lowdown Drifters on bass, completing the current lineup as the band relocated to Fort Worth, Texas. The Lowdown Drifters released their second LP, "Cheating On A Memory" with producer, Tim Allen, in three chapters on June 24th, August 19th, and September 30th. They performed at the Hwy 30 Music Festival with Shane Smith and The Saints, Lainey Wilson, and Mike and the Moonpies, and Wild Hare Music Festival in Canby, Oregon with Zach Bryan and Charles Wesley Godwin. The band also played shows supporting Roger Clyne and the Peacemakers and Reckless Kelly.

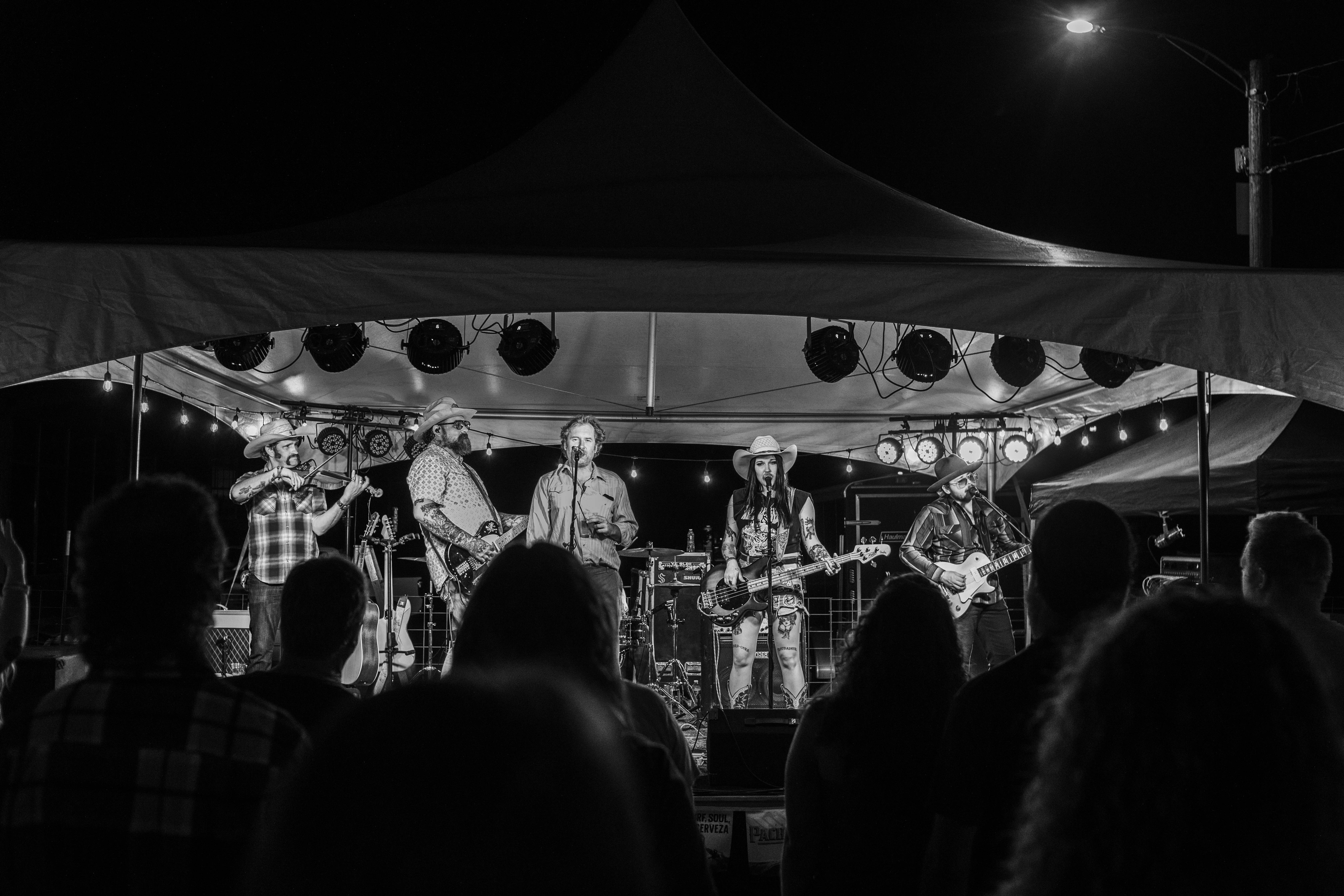
The Lowdown Drifters with Leroy Virgil of Hellbound Glory.

The band toured extensively in 2023 with appearances at Hwy 30 Festival in Filer, Idaho with Morgan Wade and Whiskey Myers, Jackalope Jamboree Festival in Pendleton, Oregon with Ryan Bingham and Margo Price, and Hwy 30 Festival at Texas Motor Speedway with Zach Bryan and Cody Jinks. On June 23rd, The Lowdown Drifters released the single "Hanging Tree", featuring Billy Don Burns.

=== In Time (2024 – ) ===
In early 2024, the band went to Norman, Oklahoma to record with Grammy nominated producer Wes Sharon. They released their third LP, "In Time" on Oct 25th, with the singles "In Time"(co-written by John Cannon and Drew Harakal), "Ghost" (written by Ryan Klein), and "Awful Truth" (written by Raina Wallace) were released before the album. The album features Drew Harakal on keyboards, as well as covers of "Trucker Speed" by Fred Eaglesmith and "Streets Of Aberdeen" by Hellbound Glory. The Lowdown Drifters headlined a charity event at the historic Billy Bob's Texas in Fort Worth, Texas. They supported Silverada on a west coast run that included the historic Troubadour (West Hollywood, California). The band played numerous shows with Shane Smith and The Saints, including Wheatstock Fest, Hwy 30 Fest, Saints Weekend in the Sawtooths, The Showbox in Seattle, and the historic Ryman Auditorium in Nashville, Tennessee.

In early 2025, the single "Fire In Her Eyes" reached 30 million streams on Spotify. The band headlined shows at the historic Cain's Ballroom and Gruene Hall.

== Discography ==
=== Studio albums ===
Title	Release	Details
Last Call for Dreamers	April 19, 2019	Produced by Malcolm Springer
In Time	Oct 25, 2024	Produced by Wes Sharon

=== Extended Plays ===
Title	Release	Details
Wood & Water	March 12, 2016	Self Produced
With A Little Help From My Friends	June 4, 2021	Produced by Tim Lightyear Gold Towne Music
Cheating on a Memory Chapter 1	June 24, 2022	Produced by Tim Lightyear Gold Towne Music
Cheating on a Memory Chapter 2	Aug 19, 2022	Produced by Tim Lightyear Gold Towne Music
Cheating on a Memory Chapter 3	Sept 30, 2022	Produced by Tim Lightyear Gold Towne Music

=== Singles ===
Title	Release	Details	Collection
We Three Kings	Feb 15, 2019	Produced by Malcolm Springer	Last Call for Dreamers
Red Rock	March 14, 2019	Produced by Malcolm Springer	Last Call for Dreamers
Alright	May 22, 2020	Produced by Tim Lightyear Gold Towne Music	Singles
Hammer Down	June 26, 2020	Produced by Tim Lightyear Gold Towne Music	Singles
If I Had A Dollar	Aug 7, 2020	Produced by Tim Lightyear Gold Towne Music	Singles
The Ballad of the Reef Shadow	Sept 4, 2020	Produced by Tim Lightyear Gold Towne Music	Singles
Headstone	Oct 2, 2020	Produced by Tim Lightyear Gold Towne Music	Singles
Give Up on the Dream (Feat. Dalton Domino)	Dec 11, 2020	Produced by Tim Lightyear Gold Towne Music	Singles
Hanging Tree (Feat. Billy Don Burns)	June 23, 2023	Produced by Tim Lightyear Gold Towne Music	Singles
Bridges To Burn	May 24, 2024	Produced by Malcolm Springer	Singles
In Time	Aug 16, 2024	Produced by Wes Sharon	In Time
Awful Truth	Sept 13, 2024	Produced by Wes Sharon	In Time
Ghost	Oct 11, 2024	Produced by Wes Sharon	In Time
