= The Price of Admission (album) =

Studio album by Turnpike Troubadours
- Released: April 11, 2025
- Studio: Sunset Sound Studio 3 Los Angeles, California
- Genre: Red dirt; Americana; country
- Length: 45:04
- Label: Bossier City Records
- Producer: Shooter Jennings

Turnpike Troubadours chronology
A Cat in the Rain (2023)	The Price of Admission (2025)

Singles from The Price of Admission
- 1. "Heaven Passing Through" Released: August 18, 2025

The Price of Admission is the sixth studio album by American band Turnpike Troubadours, released on April 11, 2025. The album was produced by Shooter Jennings, the band’s second consecutive collaboration following 2023's A Cat in the Rain. "Heaven Passing Through" was released as a single to country radio on August 18, 2025.

== Background ==
=== Production ===
Evan Felker described the album’s writing process as driven entirely by feeling. "If I had an idea that gave me a feeling, I would pursue it," he told Rolling Stone. The songs were developed over the course of 30 days on Felker’s ranch outside Okemah, Oklahoma. In a departure from his usual solo writing style, Felker collaborated with several artists, including John Fullbright, Ketch Secor of Old Crow Medicine Show, and Dave Simonett of Trampled by Turtles. Bandmates Kyle Nix (fiddle) and RC Edwards (bass) also contributed songs.

The Price of Admission was recorded at Sunset Sound Studio 3 in Los Angeles. Jennings, who favored instinctual production over pre-planning, encouraged the band to move quickly and naturally through the recording process. The experience was shaped by observing the band's onstage interactions, particularly from their stadium dates with Zach Bryan, where Jennings was invited by Felker to accompany the band on keyboard.

=== Release and critical reception ===
The album was released with minimal traditional promotion. Felker cited changes in the music industry as part of the inspiration for the low-key rollout, noting the current fan preference for rapid, unfiltered musical output. One week prior, the band hinted at the release with cryptic billboard ads around Stillwater, Oklahoma, and a song drop on TouchTunes jukeboxes - a nod to their previous album’s accidental early leak via the same platform.

== Track listing ==
All tracks are written by Evan Felker.

No.	Title	Writer(s)	Length
1.	"On the Red River"	Ketch Secor	4:41
2.	"Searching for a Light"	John Fullbright	4:13
3.	"Forgiving You"		4:38
4.	"Be Here"		4:57
5.	"Heaven Passing Through"		4:00
6.	"The Devil Plies His Trade (Sn 6 Ep 3)"	Kyle Nix	4:16
7.	"A Lie Agreed Upon"		3:49
8.	"Ruby Ann"	RC Edwards, Lance Roark	3:10
9.	"What Was Advertised"		3:26
10.	"Leaving Town (Woody Guthrie Festival)"	Dave Simonett	4:17
11.	"Nothing You Can Do"	Kyle Nix	3:31
Total length:			45:04

== Charts ==
Chart performance for The Price of Admission
Chart (2025)	Peak position
US Billboard 200	150
