= John Calvin Abney =

American musician

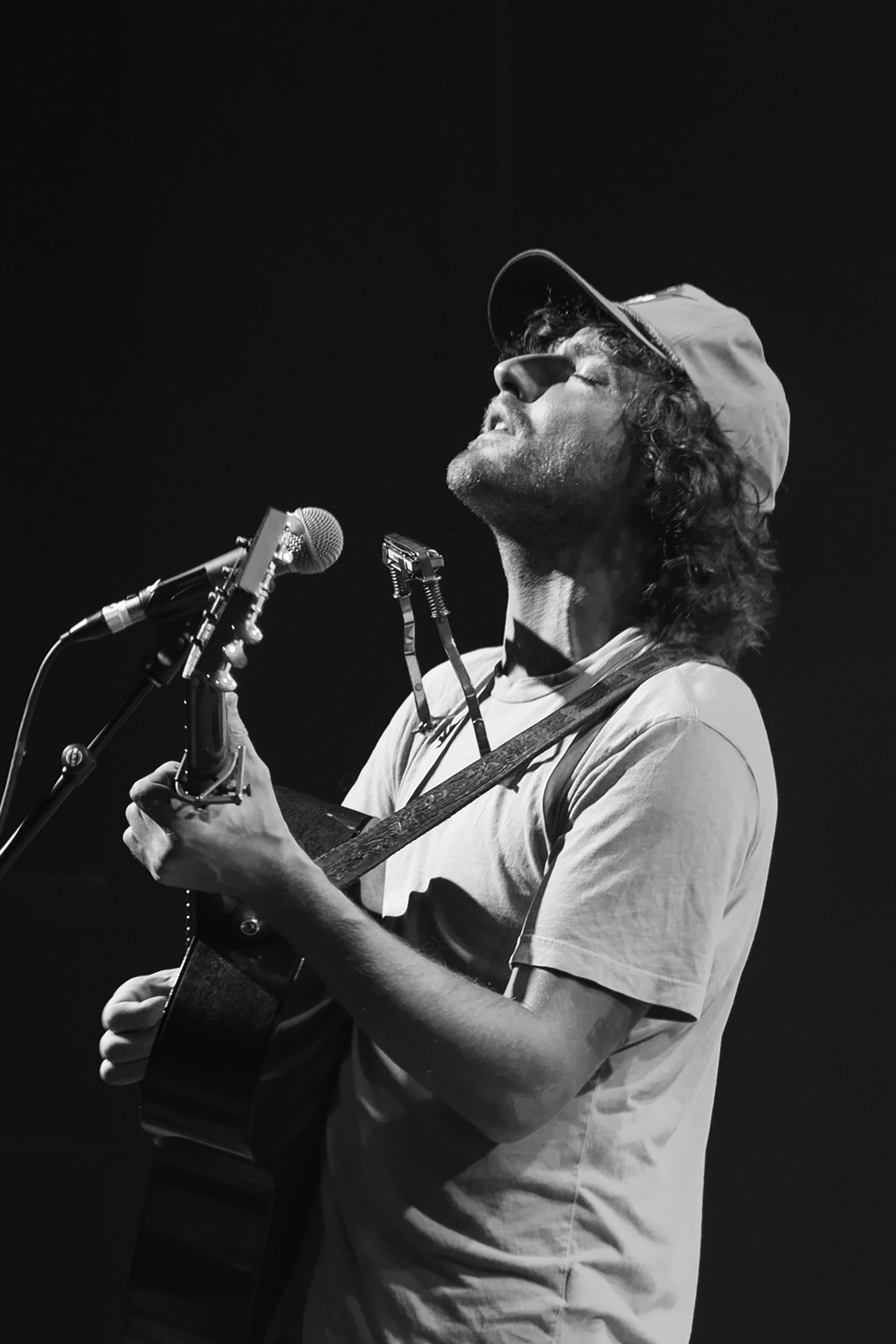
- Abney performing in 2022

Background information
- Born: Reno, Nevada, US
- Origin: Austin, Texas, US
- Genres: Alt-Country, Folk
- Occupations: Multi-instrumentalist, Singer-Songwriter, Producer, Arranger, Composer
- Instruments: guitar, piano, vocals, harmonica
- Labels: Tin Canyon Records, Foolish Philosophy, Horton Records/CRS, Black Mesa Records
- Website: JohnCalvinAbney.com

John Calvin Abney is an American musician, songwriter, multi-instrumentalist, arranger and producer. Abney currently resides in Austin, Texas.

== Early life ==
Abney was born in Reno, Nevada, relocating to Tulsa, Oklahoma as a child. He learnt guitar and piano, playing local shows in and around Tulsa through his later teenage years. After high school Abney moved to Norman, to attend the University of Oklahoma.

== Career ==
During his time at the University of Oklahoma, Abney began to collaborate with various other artists, in addition to continuing to play his own shows. Following his graduation he focused on music full-time, touring nationally and self-releasing 3 EPs: 2012's Without Wax, Empty Candles in 2014 and Vice Versa Suite in 2015.

On January 25, 2015 Abney released his first full-length album titled Better Luck via Foolish Philosophy Records. The album was recorded in a nine-day span at Tiny Telephone Studios in San Francisco, California.

He followed with Far Cries and Close Calls on September 23, 2016, via Horton Records, and Coyote on May 28, 2018 on Black Mesa Records, both of which were recorded in 3-day periods at Fellowship Hall Sound in Little Rock, Arkansas.

Safe Passage was released on Black Mesa Records on September 27, 2019. The album was recorded at Ramble Creek Studio in Austin, Texas, and featured longtime friend and collaborator John Moreland, Will Johnson and Shonna Tucker, formerly of Drive By Truckers.

Abney and Moreland also worked together on Moreland's albums, with Abney playing various roles including engineer, co-writer and multi-instrumentalist beginning with High on Tulsa Heat. Abney also toured with Moreland as a sideman for several years.

On November 20, 2020, Familiar Ground was released on Black Mesa Records, this time with John Moreland co-producing. The lead single from the album When This Blows Over, featured a music video directed by fellow Oklahoma artist Samantha Crain.

Tourist, released August 5, 2022 on Black Mesa Records, was recorded in an assortment of rooms and hotels across California, Nevada, Texas, and Oklahoma during the pandemic. Using his personal portable studio, Abney grew the songs, with drum machines, samplers, and synthesizers, working remotely with co-producer and sole collaborator John Moreland, who performed his parts and mixed from his own studio.

Abney has toured nationally and internationally, both playing his own shows and opening for other artists, including the UK, Europe, Australia and New Zealand. He has played guitar and keys live for various artists including John Moreland, Samantha Crain, Wild Child, Margo Cilker and Lizzie No, as well as undertaking session work on dozens of projects.

Abney's music has been featured in national and international press, including Rolling Stone, Billboard, American Songwriter, Americana UK and Gold Flake Paint.

While his main focus has been alternative folk music, Abney has also released a number of ambient albums: Wildfire Suite, released February 5, 2021, Storm Variations, released February 3, 2023, and Departure Nocturnes, released April 7, 2023.

Abney also DJs regularly, spinning vinyl frequently around Austin, and at events including festivals like Outside Lands with Wild Child.

== Discography ==
Studio albums

- Tourist (2022, Black Mesa Records)
- Familiar Ground (2020, Black Mesa Records)
- Safe Passage (2019, Black Mesa Records)
- Coyote (2018, Black Mesa Records)
- Far Cries and Close Calls (2016, Horton Records)
- Better Luck (2015, Foolish Philosophy)

Ambient Albums

- Departure Nocturnes (2023, Tin Canyon Records)
- Storm Variations (2023, Tin Canyon Records)
- Wildfire Suite (2021, Tin Canyon Records)

EPs

- Vice Versa Suite (2015, self-released)
- Empty Candles (2014, self-released)
- Without Wax (2012, self-released)

Score

- Terlton - Film (2019, Directed by Sterlin Harjo)

John Calvin Abney also appears on:

- Wild Child - End of The World (2023, Wurlitzer, Rhodes, Keyboards, Piano, Pedal Steel, Guitars)
- John Moreland - Birds in the Ceiling (2022, Ukulele, Piano, Mellotron, Synthesizer)
- The Damn Quails - Clouding Up Your City (2022 Producer, Piano, Rhodes, Synthesizers, Guitars, Harmonica, Tape Delays, Vocals)
- Shonna Tucker - A Brother's Love (2021, Guitars, Spaceship Buttons)
- John Moreland - LP5 (2020, Guitar, Harmonica, Piano, Organ, Mellotron, Synthesizer)
- Samantha Crain - A Small Death (2020, Guitar, Piano, Keyboards)
- Samantha Crain - High Horse (2020, Piano)
- Beau Jennings - Son of Thunderbird (2020, Guitar)
- Beth Bombara - Evergreen (2019, Harmonica, Organ, Piano, Producer)
- Poolboy - Poolboy (2019, Co-Writing, Arrangement, Drums, Vocals)
- Carter Sampson - Lucky (2018, Guitar, Harmonica, Keyboards, Percussion)
- Levi Parham - It's All Good (2018, Vocals)
- John Moreland - Big Bad Luv (2017, Dobro, Guitars, Harmonica, Organ, Piano, Wurlitzer)
- Porter and The Bluebonnet Rattlesnakes - Don't Go Baby It's Gonna Get Weird Without You (2017, Accordion, Guitars, Keyboards, Pedal Steel, Percussion, Vocals)
- M. Lockwood Porter - How to Dream Again (2016, Guitars, Lap Steel, Harmonica, Percussion)
- Samantha Crain - Under Branch and Thorn and Tree (2015, Piano, Synthesizer, Percussion)
- John Moreland - High on Tulsa Heat (2015, Co-Writer, Engineer, Guitars, Pedal Steel, Wurlitzer, Piano, Keyboards)
- Samantha Crain - Kid Face (2013, Banjo, Piano, Synthesizer)
- Poolboy - Soda Kids (2013, Arrangement, Drums, Vocals)
