= Levi Parham =

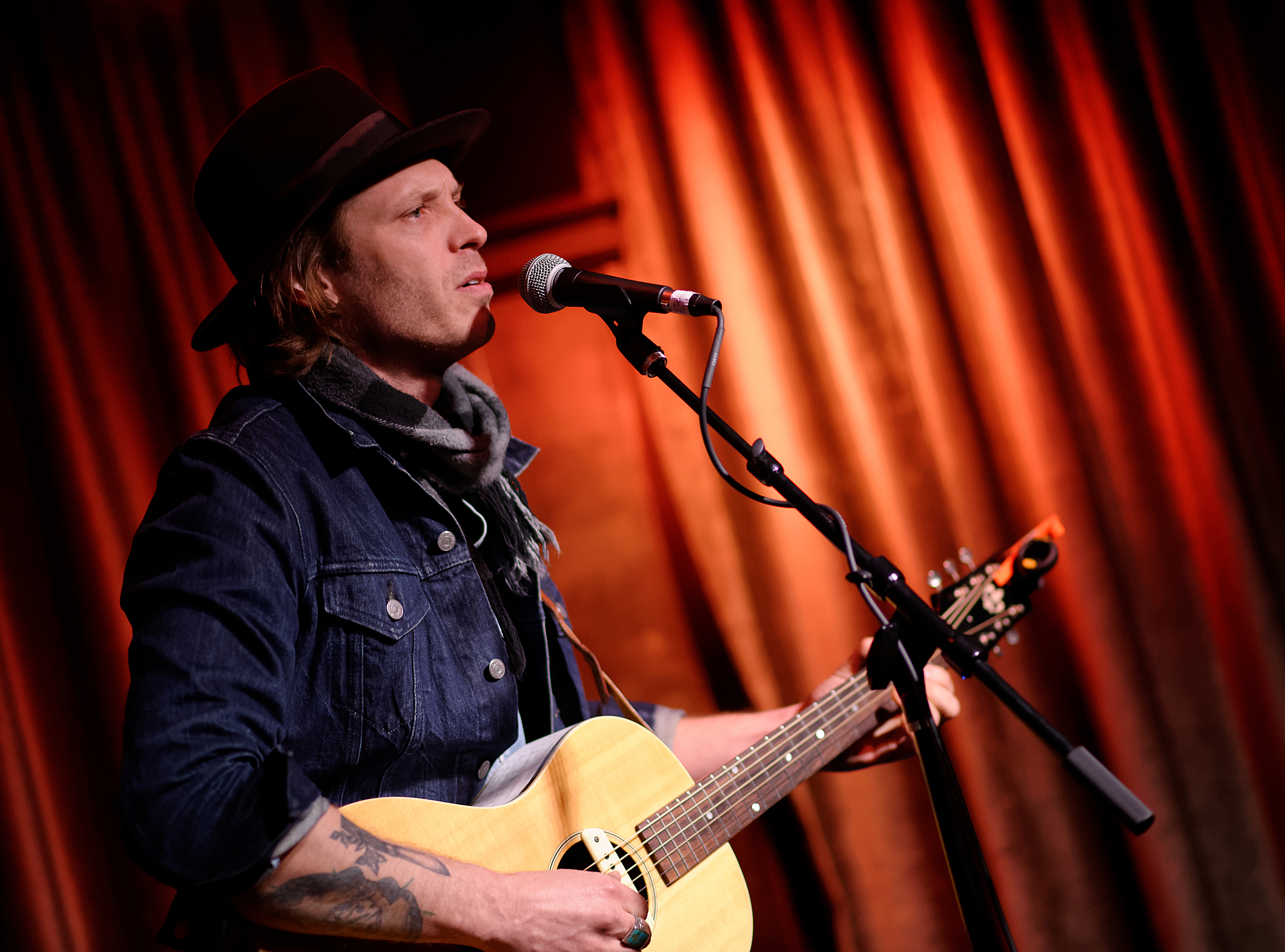

Background information
- Origin: McAlester, Oklahoma, United States
- Genres: Blues, folk, country, Americana
- Labels: AGD Entertainment
- Website: www.leviparham.com

Levi Parham is an American singer/songwriter, recording artist from McAlester, Oklahoma, United States.

== Early life ==
Levi grew up in southeast Oklahoma listening to his father's large album collection, especially the blues.

== Career ==
Parham began his career in 2013, self-releasing his first album, An Okie Opera. Currentland Magazine named it one of the top Red Dirt albums of the year, alongside Samantha Crain, Red Dirt Rangers, and Jason Boland. He followed that release in 2014 with a six song EP, Avalon Drive.

After touring the U.S., Parham met producer Jimmy LaFave, who later signed him to Music Road Records in December 2015. Parham went into Cedar Creek Studios in Austin, Texas with LaFave to work on his next album. These American Blues was released on 24 June 2016 to favorable reviews. PopMatters Magazine said of the title song, "It could stand as a rootsy election year anthem", while Elmore Magazine said Parham "sings with an occasionally world-weary, sometimes playful, but always powerful authority on America." These American Blues rose quickly on the Americana Music Association chart, topping out at No. 23.

In 2017, Parham toured Europe several times, with sold-out shows and festival dates in Spain, Netherlands, Italy, Germany, Switzerland, and Belgium, sharing stages with Jason Isbell, Margo Price, Chuck Prophet, Jonny Lang, Sam Outlaw, Jim Lauderdale, Hurray for the Riff Raff, Ben Miller Band, The Secret Sisters, Jesse Dayton, and more.

In June 2017, Parham was featured on a various artists' tribute to Mark Heard, Treasure of the Broken Land: The Songs of Mark Heard, which showcased Heard's songwriting performed by Buddy Miller, Rodney Crowell, North Mississippi Allstars, Over the Rhine, Sara Potenza, and more. While working on this project, Parham befriended Amy Helm and the two sang a duo together. Later that year, Parham went on the road as supporting act for Helm, with a tour up the US West Coast and Canada.

Sometime in early 2017 while touring through the South, Parham got the chance to visit a recording studio that was once owned and operated by The Swampers, the rhythm section that started the Muscle Shoals Sound. While visiting with the engineer at the studio and touring the facilities, Parham got the idea to bring a crew of his Tulsa friends to Muscle Shoals to combine both styles of music, and to get it all on tape. Parham assembled the line-up and in August 2017 he brought John Fullbright, Dustin Pittsley, Jesse Aycock, Dylan Golden Aycock, John Moreland, Lauren Barth, Paul Benjaman, and Michael Staub into Studio B at what is now called Portside Sound to cut a record. The session cut most songs live. The album was released in June 2018, It's All Good, via Horton Records. This Land Press called it "A beautiful mixture of the Tulsa Sound and the Muscle Shoals history, resulting in an exciting blend of Southern vibes, soulful grooves, and mean guitar battles." while another review said, "It's all good? No, It's all brilliant."

In 2018, Parham was featured in a video music series called "Play It Loud", focusing on Oklahoma bred music artists, which won a Heartland Emmy.

== Discography ==
=== Studio albums ===
- An Okie Opera (2013, self-released)
- These American Blues (2016, Music Road Records)
- It's All Good (2018, Horton Records)
- Sure, Okay, Great (2022, self-released)

=== EPs ===
- Avalon Drive (2014, self-released)

=== Various artist compilation album ===
- Treasure of the Broken Land: The Songs of Mark Heard (2017, Storm Weathered Records)
