= A Cat in the Rain =

Studio album by Turnpike Troubadours
- Released: 2023-08-25
- Genre: Red Dirt, Americana, country
- Length: 40:23
- Label: Bossier City Records, Thirty Tigers

Turnpike Troubadours chronology
A Long Way from Your Heart (2017)	A Cat in the Rain (2023)	The Price of Admission (2025)

A Cat in the Rain is the fifth studio album by American Red Dirt band Turnpike Troubadours, released on August 25, 2023, through Bossier City Records and Thirty Tigers. Produced by Shooter Jennings, the album marked the band's return following a five-year hiatus that began in 2019.

== Background ==
=== Production ===
After a self-imposed hiatus due to frontman Evan Felker's personal struggles, including a battle with alcoholism, Turnpike Troubadours reunited in 2022. In early 2023, the band officially announced A Cat in the Rain, their first studio album in over six years since 2017’s A Long Way from Your Heart. The album was produced by Shooter Jennings, who was brought on to guide the band through a more expansive and emotionally layered recording process than in their previous work. The recording sessions unfolded over several months across two primary locations: FAME Recording Studios in Muscle Shoals, Alabama, and Dave’s Room in Los Angeles, California. While Felker remained the band’s principal songwriter, the material reflected a more collaborative spirit than earlier albums.

=== Release and critical reception ===
The album's release was preceded by singles "Mean Old Sun," "Chipping Mill," and "Brought Me." Overall, the album received generally positive reviews from critics, who praised its lyrical depth and emotional resonance, though some noted a more subdued musical approach compared to the band's earlier work. The Associated Press highlighted the album's themes of resilience and gratitude, particularly evident in the track "Brought Me," which Felker described as a message to fans who supported the band during their hiatus. Slant Magazine characterized the album as "eminently professional" but containing "few surprises."

== Track listing ==
No.	Title	Length
1.	"Mean Old Sun"	4:08
2.	"Brought Me"	4:52
3.	"Lucille"	3:43
4.	"Chipping Mill"	3:20
5.	"The Rut"	4:33
6.	"A Cat in the Rain"	5:17
7.	"Black Sky"	2:53
8.	"East Side Love Song (Bottoms Up)"	3:24
9.	"Three More Days"	3:07
10.	"Won't You Give Me One More Chance"	5:03
Total length:		40:23
