= Goodbye Normal Street =

Studio album by Turnpike Troubadours
- Released: 2012
- Recorded: 115 Recording
- Genre: Country music, Roots rock
- Length: 45:05
- Label: Bossier City
- Producer: Wes Sharon

Turnpike Troubadours chronology
| Diamonds & Gasoline (2010) | Goodbye Normal Street (2012) | The Turnpike Troubadours (2015) |

Goodbye Normal Street is a 2012 studio album by the American country music band Turnpike Troubadours. The band's third album, it was released in May 2012. All of the songs were written or co-written by band members RC Edwards and Evan Felker. Many of the songs are either biographical or semi-biographical. It was the band's first album to chart in the Billboard 200 and the Billboard Country Albums charts.

== Release ==
The album, released in May 2012, was the Red Dirt bands' third studio album. It is named after a street in Tahlequah, Oklahoma, where many of the album's songs were written, although one of the band's members compared the name to beginning to go out on the road as a band by saying "any normalcy we had is pretty much over with". Eric Woods at the Abilene Reporter-News noted that the title was prophetic of how the band members' lives became abnormal as they went on tour. Personnel for the band at the time of the album was Evan Felker as lead singer and guitarist, RC Edwards on bass guitar, Kyle Nix on the fiddle, Ryan Engleman as the lead guitarist, and Gabriel Pearson on drums. The album was produced by Wes Sharon at the 115 Recording studio in Norman, Oklahoma.

== Content ==
Genre-wise, a reviewer for the Times Record News described the album as country with some roots rock tendencies. All of the songs were written or cowritten by band members. Much of the album had biographical or autobiographic tendencies. Edwards wrote "Morgan Street" about a bar that the band formerly played in, while the military-themed songs "Blue Star" and "Southeastern Son" were penned by Felker as "character pieces" about people that he knew. Felker also stated that he wanted the album to provide a "real band-playing" feel, rather than the auto-tuned and perfectly metronome-aligned music that he felt was common on country radio. One reviewer described "Gin, Smoke, Lies" as a "funky, bluegrass groove", while another stated that "Quit While I'm Ahead" included Cajun themes. The character of Lorrie from "Good Lord Lorrie" has since appeared in several of the band's later songs. Reviewer Stephen Thomas Erlewine, writing for AllMusic, noted that the album contained more elements of Texas country music than the band's previous album, "Diamonds & Gasoline". Erlewine also compared Felker's writing to Steve Earle and Townes Van Zandt.

== Reception ==
Don Chance, writing for the Times Record News, described the album as "one of the best albums from a 'not-Nashville' band I've heard in a long time, while praising the performance and variety of "Before the Devil Knows We're Dead", "Call a Spade a Spade", "Wrecked", "Good Lord Lorrie", and "Gone". The album was the band's first to chart on the Billboard 200 and Billboard Country Albums charts, reaching number 57 on the former and number 14 on the latter. By September 2012, two singles from the album, "Gin, Smoke, Lies" and "Good Lord Lorrie" had reached the top 10 in Texas regional charts.

== Track listing ==
| No. | Title | Writer(s) | Length |
|---|---|---|---|
| 1. | "Gin, Smoke & Lies" | Evan Felker | 4:35 |
| 2. | "Before the Devil Knows We're Dead" | R. C. Edwards, Felker | 3:52 |
| 3. | "Southeastern Son" | Felker | 3:31 |
| 4. | "Blue Star" | Felker | 3:21 |
| 5. | "Call a Spade a Spade" | Felker, Jamie Wilson | 4:34 |
| 6. | "Morgan Street" | Edwards | 3:41 |
| 7. | "Gone, Gone, Gone" | Felker | 4:08 |
| 8. | "Good Lord Lorrie" | Felker | 4:58 |
| 9. | "Empty as a Drum" | Felker | 3:27 |
| 10. | "Wrecked" | Edwards, Felker | 4:57 |
| 11. | "Quit While I'm Ahead" | Felker | 4:01 |
