= The Turnpike Troubadours (album) =

Studio album by Turnpike Troubadours
- Released: September 18, 2015
- Genre: Country, red dirt
- Label: Bossier City Records

Turnpike Troubadours chronology
Goodbye Normal Street (2012)	The Turnpike Troubadours (2015)	A Long Way from Your Heart (2017)

The Turnpike Troubadours is the fourth studio album by American country music band Turnpike Troubadours. It was released on September 18, 2015, by Bossier City Records. The album followed the band's 2012 release, Goodbye Normal Street. It is a country music, specifically the subgenre red dirt, album, with other influences from Cajun music, honky Tonk, and roots rock.

== Release ==
The album debuted at number 17 on the Billboard 200 and number 3 on the Top Country Albums chart.

== Track listing ==
No.	Title	Length
1.	"The Bird Hunters"	5:11
2.	"The Mercury"	3:43
3.	"Down Here"	3:09
4.	"Time of Day"	3:23
5.	"Ringing in the Year"	4:15
6.	"A Little Song"	2:44
7.	"Long Drive Home"	4:10
8.	"Easton & Main"	3:57
9.	"7 Oaks"	4:01
10.	"Doreen"	3:10
11.	"Fall Out of Love"	3:27
12.	"Bossier City"	3:18
