= Puller (band) =

American post-grunge band

- Origin: United States
- Genres: Hard rock; Christian rock; post-grunge
- Label: Tooth & Nail
- Spinoff of: For Love Not Lisa
- Past members: Mike Lewis; Mike Miles; Clint McBay; Geoff Riley; Corey French; Ryan Jewell; Wes Sharon; Dustin Holt

Puller was a post-grunge band formed in the mid-1990s. They released three full-length albums and one Split EP for Tooth & Nail Records.

Three of Puller's members were also members of For Love Not Lisa, who released two albums for Atlantic Records in the early 1990s.

== Members ==
The following is a partial list of the members involved in Puller.

- Mike Lewis - Vocals, Guitar
- Geoff Riley - Drums
- Mike Miles - Guitar
- Corey French - Guitar
- Ryan Jewell - Bass
- Clint McBay - Bass
- Wes Sharon - Bass
- Dustin Holt - Bass
- Jeff Bellew

== Discography ==
- Sugarless (1996, Tooth & Nail Records)
- Split EP (with Roadside Monument) (1997, Tooth & Nail Records)
- Closer Than You Think (1998, Tooth & Nail Records)
- Live @ Tom Fest (1999, 6x6)
- What's Mine At Twilight (2001, Tooth & Nail Records)

In addition, Puller was featured on several of Tooth & Nail's compilations in the mid-1990s.
