= A Long Way from Your Heart =

Studio album by Turnpike Troubadours
- Released: October 20, 2017
- Genres: Red Dirt, Country
- Length: 39:46
- Label: Bossier City

Turnpike Troubadours chronology
The Turnpike Troubadours (2015)	A Long Way from Your Heart (2017)	A Cat in the Rain (2023)

Professional ratings
Aggregate scores
Source	Rating
Metacritic	84/100
Review scores
Source	Rating
AllMusic	4/5 stars
Blurt	4/5 stars

A Long Way from Your Heart is the fifth studio album by American country band Turnpike Troubadours. It was released on October 20, 2017 through Bossier City Records.

== Accolades ==
Publication	Accolade	Rank	Ref.
Rolling Stone	Top 40 Americana/Country Albums of 2017	34	

== Track listing ==
No.	Title	Length
1.	"The Housefire"	3:39
2.	"Something to Hold On To"	4:46
3.	"The Winding Stair Mountain Blues"	3:27
4.	"Unrung"	3:07
5.	"A Tornado Warning"	3:43
6.	"Pay No Rent"	4:01
7.	"The Hard Way"	2:53
8.	"Old Time Feeling (Like Before)"	3:17
9.	"Pipe Bomb Dream"	3:20
10.	"Oklahoma Stars"	3:13
11.	"Sunday Morning Paper"	4:10

== Charts ==
Chart (2017)	Peak position
US Billboard 200	20
US Americana/Folk Albums (Billboard)	1
US Independent Albums (Billboard)	1
US Top Country Albums (Billboard)	3
