= Wes Sharon =

American musician, record producer, and recording engineer

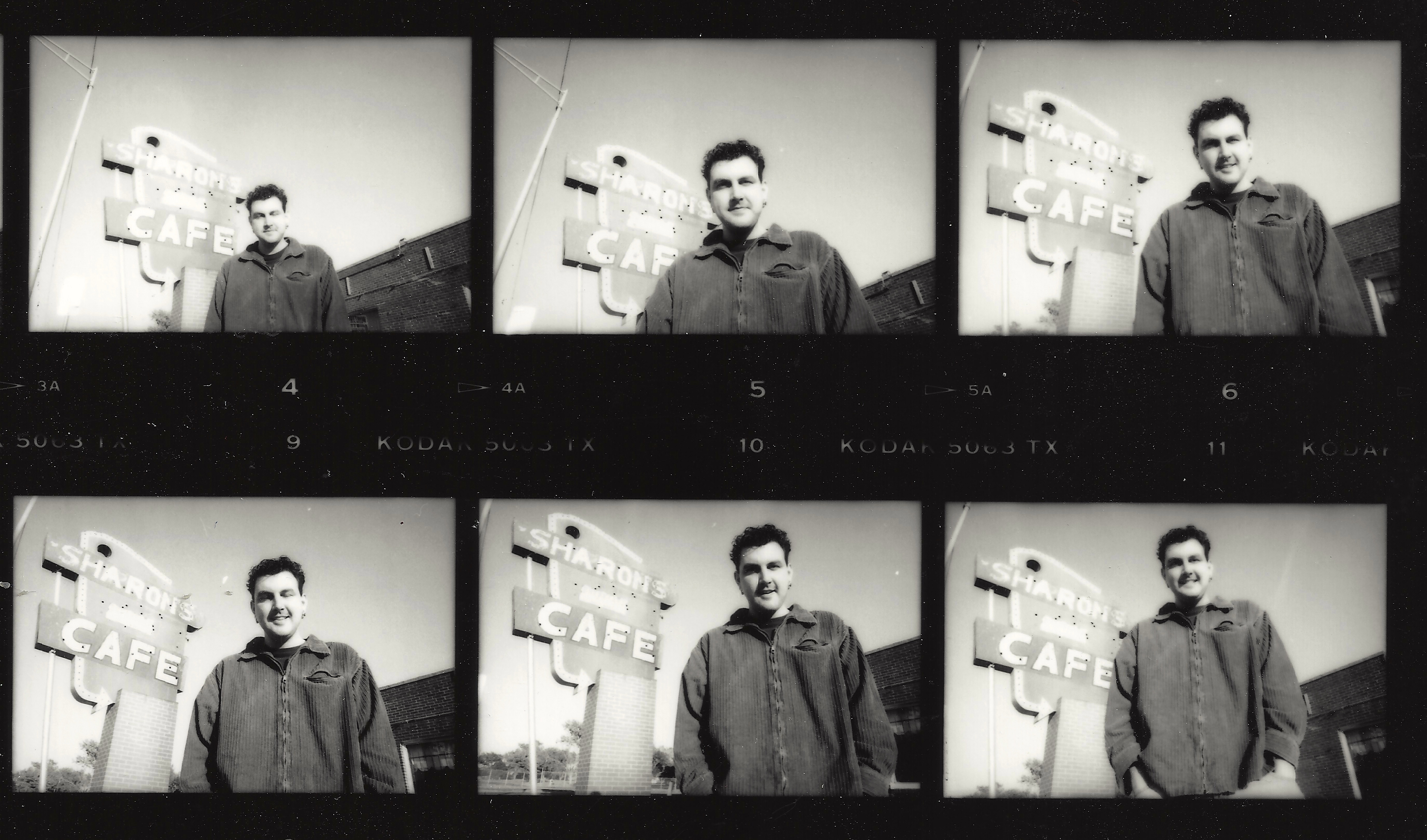
- Wes Sharon

Background information
- Born: January 23, 1970 (age 56)
- Origin: Tulsa, Oklahoma, United States
- Genres: Americana, Rock, Punk, Country
- Occupations: Musician, producer, recording engineer, studio owner
- Instruments: Bass guitar, guitar
- Years active: 1983–present

Wes Sharon (born January 23, 1970, Tulsa, Oklahoma, United States) is an American musician and an award-winning and Grammy nominated record producer and recording engineer.

== Music career ==
=== Early years ===
Wes Sharon began his career in Oklahoma and Texas playing bass in alternative rock and punk bands. By his late teens he was being asked to produce sessions for other local bands and in 1994 he relocated to Cotati, California where he became a staff recording engineer and producer at Prairie Sun Recording Studios and had the opportunity to work with a wide variety of artists such asRemy Zero, Far (band), Simon Says (band), Gregg Allman, Wayne Perkins, Pat Travers, Rick Derringer, Tony MacAlpine, The Doobie Brothers, and Blag Dahlia & the Dwarves. Returning to Oklahoma he built his own facility and produced and engineered albums for artists such as Traindodge, Radial Spangle, Hurricane Jane, Charm Pops, Remember August, the Roustabouts, the Martini Kings and Smarty Pants. In recent years he has produced and/or engineered releases for John Fullbright, Turnpike Troubadours, Ali Harter, The Damn Quails, Camille Harp, Aranda, Parker Millsap, Jeremy Johnson & the Lonesome Few, and multiple albums with Mike McClure.

=== Later years ===
In 2012, Sharon produced and engineered releases for artists as diverse as singer/songwriter John Fullbright, Turnpike Troubadours (Goodbye Normal Street), Parker Millsap (w/ Michael Rose (bassist) on their debut album, Palisade), Chad Sullins & The Last Call Coalition (Incommunicado, their first release for Smith Music Group) and an expansive acoustic based singer/songwriter compilation project released in three volumes entitled Songs From The Alley.. for the JJ's Alley Records imprint.

The Turnpike Troubadours 2012 album, Goodbye Normal Street, was ranked as No. 1 in Lone Star Music's 100 Best Selling Albums of 2012. The album peaked at number 57 on the Billboard 200. The collection won Album of the Year and Song of the Year at the 2013 Lone Star Music Awards. Fullbright was awarded the Emerging Artist of the Year.

John Fullbright's album From The Ground Up (produced by Sharon and Fullbright and recorded and mixed by Sharon at 115 Recording) was nominated for Best Americana Album at the 55th Annual Grammy Awards held on February 10, 2013.

Parker Millsap and Michael Rose's album Palisade was named the Best Album of 2012 by the Oklahoma Gazette in their year's end "Tops of 12" issue.

Sharon was nominated for Producer of the Year in the 2013 Lone Star Music Awards citing his work with The Turnpike Troubadours and John Fullbright. Wes Sharon and The Turnpike Troubadours were awarded the 2013 Single of the Year Award by Texas Regional Radio.

Fullbright's album From The Ground Up was nominated for the 2013 Album of the Year Award by the Americana Music Association. Fullbright was also nominated for the 2013 Emerging Artist of the Year.

Sharon was the bass player for Shoe Papa Blue, Angry Son, Burnwagon, Puller and John Fullbright. He currently plays bass on various studio session dates. His playing can be heard on numerous albums including Fullbright's albums From The Ground Up and Songs, The Damn Quails' Down The Hatch and Ali Harter's Near The Knuckle.

In 2016, Sharon signed an endorsement deal with the guitar pickup maker Larry DiMarzio and now uses DiMarzio bass pickups.

Sharon produced, recorded and mixed the debut solo album for Parker Millsap (released and distributed via Okrahoma/Thirty Tigers on February 4, 2014).

In 2014, Sharon produced, recorded and mixed an album for Texas singer/songwriter Troy Cartwright, the winner of the 25th annual B. W. Stevenson Songwriting Competition in Dallas, and the recipient of the 2014 Rising Star Texas Music Award. The album was released in 2015 and distributed by RED/Sony.

In November 2014, Sharon began producing sessions for The Grahams. Sharon also engineered and mixed the album, and it was released on May 19, 2015 on 12 South Records/RED and Sony (Australia).

In May 2015, Sharon was asked to complete the recording and to mix the Turnpike Troubadours album, titled The Turnpike Troubadours (produced by guitarist Ryan Engleman and engineer Matt Wright). It was released on September 18, 2015 on Bossier City/Thirty Tigers and debuted at No. 3 on the Billboard Country Chart. In a Best of 2015 review Farce the Music stated, "There's space, separation, and vividness in the sound. The slower songs soar, the rockers punch, and there's fiddle and steel galore. On a good set of speakers, this thing is stunning."

Sharon produced the debut, self-titled, solo release for Jared Deck. Its first single, "17 Miles", was debuted via Rolling Stone and on the strength of that effort Deck was selected as one of Rolling Stone's 10 New Country Artists You Need To Know in March 2016. Of the experience Deck was quoted as saying, "Wes understands songs and the people who write them. He helped me find a voice I didn't know I had." The album was released in May 2016.

Sharon was featured in the June 28, 2016 edition of The Daily Country. Sharon was featured in the August 8, 2016 edition of the Blugrass Situation in The Producers. He was also featured in the August 11, 2016 of NTown. He was featured in the September, 2016 issue of Mix Magazine in the Profiles section.

Sharon mixed and produced the fourth full album by Johnny Manchild and the Poor Bastards Rapture Waltz, released in March 2024.

=== Personal life ===
Wes Sharon owns and operates the audio recording facility 115 Recording in Norman, Oklahoma, where he lives with his wife and son.
