= LP5 (John Moreland album) =

Studio album by John Moreland
- Released: February 7, 2020
- Length: 40:56
- Label: Old Omens
- Producer: Matt Pence

John Moreland chronology
Big Bad Luv (2017)	LP5 (2020)

Professional ratings
Aggregate scores
Source	Rating
Metacritic	77/100
Review scores
Source	Rating
AllMusic	3.5/5 stars
American Songwriter	4/5 stars
Pitchfork	7.6/10
Under the Radar	8/10

LP5 is the fifth studio album by American musician John Moreland. It was released on February 7, 2020 under Old Omens.

== Critical reception ==
LP5 was met with generally favorable reviews from critics. At Metacritic, which assigns a weighted average rating out of 100 to reviews from mainstream publications, this release received an average score of 77, based on 9 reviews.

== Track listing ==
All tracks are written by John Moreland.

LP5 track listing
No.	Title	Length
1.	"Harder Dreams"	4:22
2.	"A Thought Is Just a Passing Train"	5:24
3.	"East October"	3:45
4.	"I'm Learning How to Tell Myself the Truth"	3:18
5.	"Two Stars"	1:21
6.	"Terrestrial"	4:19
7.	"In Times Between"	3:18
8.	"When My Fever Breaks"	3:41
9.	"I Always Let You Burn Me to the Ground"	4:35
10.	"For Ichiro"	1:42
11.	"Let Me Be Understood"	5:11

== Charts ==
Chart performance for LP5
Chart (2020)	Peak position
UK Americana Albums (OCC)	3
UK Independent Albums (OCC)	42
US Americana/Folk Albums (Billboard)	7
US Heatseekers Albums (Billboard)	15
US Top Album Sales (Billboard)	34
US Vinyl Albums (Billboard)	22
