= Samantha Crain =

Choctaw Nation singer-songwriter (born 1986)

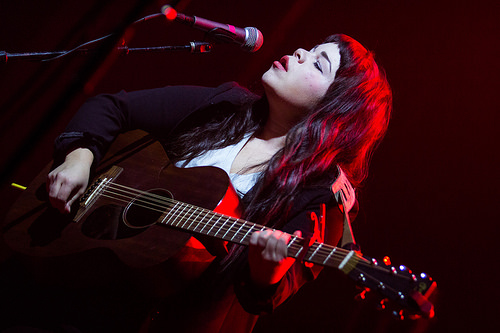
- Crain in concert in LA at the Wiltern

Background information
- Born: Samantha Jo Crain; August 15, 1986 (age 40); Shawnee, Oklahoma, U.S.
- Origin: Choctaw Nation
- Genres: Americana, Singer-Songwriter, Folk rock, indie
- Occupations: Musician, songwriter, singer, producer
- Instruments: Vocals, guitar, piano
- Years active: 2004–present
- Labels: Real Kind Records/Communion Music in London, UK and Ramseur Records in Concord, North Carolina and Full Time Hobby in London, UK
- Website: www.samanthacrain.com

Samantha Crain (born August 15, 1986) is a Choctaw Nation songwriter, musician, producer, and singer, signed with Real Kind Records (an imprint of Communion Records).

Crain won three NAMMYs (Native American Music Awards) in 2009 for Folk Album of the Year and Songwriter of the Year and in 2022 for Single of the Year for "Bloomsday". She also won the Indigenous Music Award for Best Rock Album in 2019. Her songs were featured on many series and films including 90210, Hung, Barking Water, The Dark Divide, Resident Alien, Reservation Dogs, Echo, and Unreserved: The Work of Louie Gong. In 2017 and 2018, she worked with the Peabody Essex Museum in Salem to compose and contribute music for the extensive T.C. Cannon exhibit At the Edge of America. In July 2018, she self-released a collection of sonnets En Masse: A Collection of 30 Sonnets by Samantha Crain. In 2022, she composed the musical score for the film Fancy Dance starring Lily Gladstone and directed by Erica Tremblay. In 2024, she composed the score for the short documentary Winding Path and feature-length documentary Drowned Land.

== Early life and education ==
Crain was born and raised in Shawnee, Oklahoma and is of Choctaw heritage. She attended Grove School in Shawnee and Dale High School in Dale, Oklahoma. As a child and teenager, Crain competed in powerlifting, holding several world and national records for a time. Crain taught herself to play guitar and wrote songs based on her short stories the summer before her senior year at Dale High School. Crain began touring when she was 19. Her first tours were either solo or as a duo with Beth Bombara. She then founded Samantha Crain and the Midnight Shivers with Jacob Edwards and Andrew Tanz and toured with this band until 2009.

== Collaborations ==
Crain has lent her voice to recordings for Murder by Death, Parker Millsap, Wild Pink, Hamish Hawk, and others. She also appeared on the chat show Conan with First Aid Kit for their filmed performance of "Stay Gold".

She has toured with the Avett Brothers, Cotton Jones, Langhorne Slim, Neutral Milk Hotel, The Mountain Goats, Murder By Death, Brandi Carlile, Watchhouse, Buffy Sainte-Marie, Amigo the Devil, John Moreland, The Staves, William Elliott Whitmore, Lucy Rose, Josh Ritter, Adrian Edmondson and the Bad Shepherds, First Aid Kit, Ha Ha Tonka, Deer Tick, Smoke Fairies, Thao and the Get Down Stay Down, Sister Suvi, Ingrid Michaelson, Meiko, Racheal Yamagata, Jenny Owen Youngs, Jessica Lea Mayfield, Emma Gatrill, American Aquarium, Erland and the Carnival, Parker Millsap, Broncho, Ali Harter, Beth Bombara, Berry, Ben Weaver, the Everybodyfields, Bombadil, Gregory Alan Isakov, Ninja Gun, and others.

Crain has self-produced many of her own recordings, but in 2014, produced the debut record of Oklahoma-based country singer-songwriter, Kierston White. The album was recorded at Blackwatch Studios in Norman, Oklahoma. It is entitled Don't Write Love Songs. Also, in 2015, she produced the album Thought of You a God by the Oklahoma-based band, Annie Oakley. In 2022, she produced the album, Reservoir, by Kinsey Charles.

== Discography ==
=== The Confiscation EP: A Musical Novella ===
Crain's first recording was the self-released EP The Confiscation. It was produced by Joey Lemon of the Chicago-based band, Berry, and later reissued by Ramseur Records in 2007. It is based on five short stories by Crain.

=== Songs in the Night ===
Crain's first LP with her former backing band, the Midnight Shivers, was the April 28, 2009 release Songs in the Night. The album was produced by Danny Kadar and recorded at Echo Mountain Studios in Asheville, North Carolina. Songs in the Night features Crain on acoustic guitar and vocals, Jacob Edwards on drums, trombone, and harmonica, Andrew Tanz on bass guitar, keys, and vocals, and Stephen Sebastian on electric guitar. Ben Wigler, formerly of the band Arizona, provides vocal harmonies on the track "Get the Fever Out".

Songs in the Night was met with critical praise. Paste magazine gave the record a rating of 78 out of 100 and featured it many times online and in the magazine. Rolling Stone magazine reviewed it with 3.5 stars out of 5, saying "Her voice is gorgeously odd — all fulsome, shape-shifting vowels that do indeed billow like fog."

=== You (Understood) ===
After the Midnight Shivers disbanded, Crain released her second LP on June 8, 2010. The album was recorded in 7 days in Joey Lemon's studio in Wichita, Kansas. It features Crain on electric guitar, acoustic guitar, vocals, and keys, Joey Lemon on bass, percussion, and vocals, Arizona's Ben Wigler on vocals and electric guitar, Eric Nauni (of Student Film, WAD, and Beau Jennings and the Tigers) on drums and percussion, and Sherree Chamberlain on vocals on "We Are the Same". Frontier Ruckus's Matthew Milia and David Jones are featured on the song "Santa Fe" with Milia on vocals and Jones on banjo. The album release was followed by an NPR Weekend Edition feature. This album was released in UK and Benelux on November 8, 2011. "Santa Fe" has gone on to be one of Crain's most loved songs.

=== A Simple Jungle ===
Crain released the 7" vinyl single, A Simple Jungle on January 10, 2012. Its two tracks ("It's Simple" and "Cadwell Jungle") were produced by John Vanderslice in San Francisco at Tiny Telephone Studios and features Anne Lillis on percussion. She has said in interviews and at performances that these two songs came out of a failed relationship while living in Grand Rapids, Michigan.

=== Kid Face ===
Produced by John Vanderslice in San Francisco at Tiny Telephone, Crain's third album Kid Face was released on February 19, 2013. John Calvin Abney (performs with John Moreland), Kyle Reid, Brine Webb, Daniel Foulks (of Parker Millsap's band), Anne Lillis, and Anna Ash contributed to the album. Jacob Winik engineered and mixed. This album was released in Europe and UK by Full Time Hobby Records on January 13, 2014. Paste magazine gave the album an 8.8 with high praise. Rolling Stone, Spin, NME, the Guardian, and No Depression all reviewed the album highly as well. Crain has mentioned the song "For the Miner" on this album was written for Jason Molina shortly before his death. A music video for the song "Never Going Back" was produced by Lamar + Nik.

=== Under Branch & Thorn & Tree ===
Crain returned to Tiny Telephone to record her 4th full-length album "Under Branch & Thorn & Tree" again with John Vanderslice producing. The album also features the Magik*Magik Orchestra led by Minna Choi. It was released July 17, 2015 on 200 gram audiophile quality vinyl boasting its fully analog recording, mixing, and mastering process. It was pressed at QRP in Salina, Kansas and mastered by Bernie Grundman. Jacob Winik engineered and mixed the album. John Calvin Abney, Jesse Aycock (Hard Working Americans, Secret Sisters), Reed Mathis (Tea Leaf Green, Jacob Fred Jazz Odyssey), Anne Lillis (Jessica Lea Mayfield, White Pines), and Meric Long (The Dodos) are all featured musicians on the record. The Guardian, Uncut, Rolling Stone, No Depression, and Blurt Magazine all reviewed the album with critical praise. A music video for the song "Killer" was produced by Dorian Electra and Weston G. Allen. Also a video for "Kathleen" was produced by Lamar + Nik.

=== You Had Me at Goodbye ===
On March 24, 2017, Crain released her 5th full-length album "You Had Me At Goodbye". It was recorded at Tiny Telephone Oakland in Oakland, CA and produced by John Vanderslice. Once again, this album boasted fully analog recording, mixing, and mastering. Jamie Riotto arranged clarinets and strings for this record and played bass. Rob Shelton, Jason Slota (Thao with the Get Down Stay Down, The Mountain Goats), David Phillips (Tom Waits, Frank Black, John Wesley Harding), Geneva Harrison (Bells Atlas), and Ben Goldberg (The Klezmorium, Bill Frisell, Nels Cline) are all featured musicians on this album. The album received critical acclaim from NPR, Impose Magazine, and the Line of Best Fit. A music video for the song "Oh Dear Louis" was created by Crain and Jared Evans (Blackwatch Studios). Crain toured the album in UK and Europe before cancelling her US tour for personal reasons. The album features the song "Red Sky, Blue Mountain" which is entirely written and sung in the Choctaw language.

=== A Small Death ===
In mid-2017, Crain was involved in three car accidents within three months, which left her in physical and mental pain and without use of her hands. Unable to write or play she dictated voice memos to her phone. After 12 months, as she began to recover, Crain started to play and write the songs that would become the album A Small Death, released by Ramseur Records and Real Kind Records on July 17, 2020.

=== Gumshoe ===
On May 2, 2025, Crain released her seventh studio album, Gumshoe, through Real Kind Records.
