= Gumshoe (album) =

Studio album by Samantha Crain
- Released: May 2, 2025
- Genre: Folk rock
- Length: 39:43
- Label: Real Kind
- Producer: Samantha Crain; Taylor Johnson; Brine Webb

Samantha Crain chronology
I Guess We Live Here Now (2021)	Gumshoe (2025)

Singles from Gumshoe
- 1. "Dart" Released: January 16, 2025

Gumshoe is the seventh studio album by American songwriter Samantha Crain. It was released on May 2, 2025, by Real Kind Records, in CD, LP and digital formats.

== Background ==
The album features eleven songs with a total runtime of approximately thirty-nine minutes, including the single "Dart", which was released on January 16, 2025. The album was preceded by Crain's 2021 EP, I Guess We Live Here Now, and her 2020 album, A Small Death.

== Reception ==
Professional ratings
Review scores
Source	Rating
The Line of Best Fit	7/10
Mojo	4/5 stars
Uncut	7/10

The Line of Best Fit rated the album seven out of ten and remarked, "Gumshoe works its considerable charms unhurriedly, gradually growing in stature and allure, and amply rewarding an attentive listener," describing it as retaining Crain's folk rock style. Uncut, also rating the album seven out of ten, stated, "Though its title implies a case to investigate, there's contentment at the heart of Samantha Crain's seventh album." Mojo rated the album four stars and noted, "It remains of a style with her widescreen, inventive folk rock roots, but there's a richness to her lyrics which have moved from observing others to confessing her own revelations and experiences." No Depression commented, "Gumshoe feels more fluid and celebratory than Crain's work has in some time."

== Track listing ==
All tracks are written by Samantha Crain.

Gumshoe track listing
No.	Title	Length
1.	"Dragonfly"	2:19
2.	"Neptune Baby"	2:48
3.	"Dart"	3:13
4.	"Ridin' Out the Storm"	5:27
5.	"Gumshoe"	2:56
6.	"Fool's Paradise"	3:17
7.	"B-Attitudes"	3:04
8.	"Trap Door"	2:27
9.	"Melatonin"	4:14
10.	"Boilermaker"	4:00
11.	"Old Hallicrafter Radio"	5:58
Total length:		39:43
