= John Fullbright =

American singer-songwriter

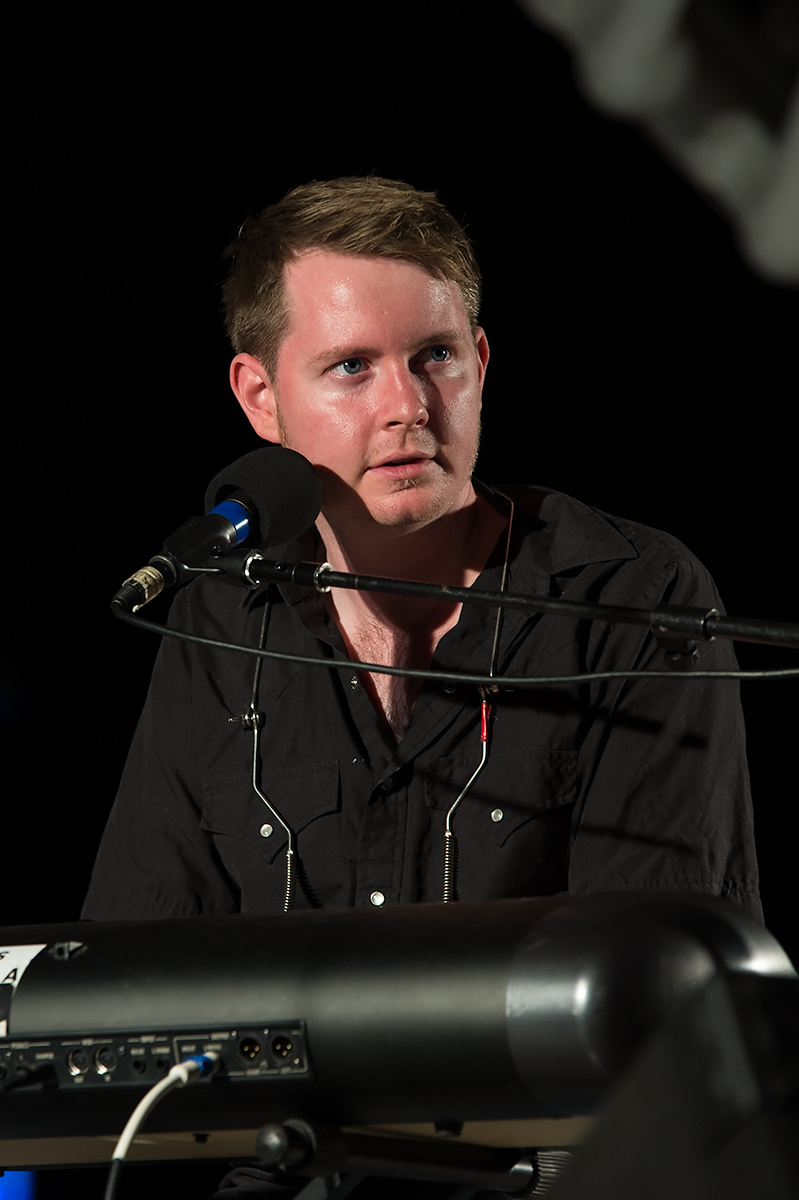
- Fullbright performing at the Myriad Gardens in Oklahoma City, OK.

Background information
- Born: April 23, 1988 (age 38); Okemah, Oklahoma; United States
- Genres: Americana; Folk; Pop; Rock
- Occupations: Musician, songwriter
- Instruments: Vocals, guitar, piano, harmonica
- Years active: 2009–present
- Label: Blue Dirt Records
- Website: johnfullbrightmusic.com

John Fullbright (born April 23, 1988) is an American singer-songwriter from Okemah, Oklahoma. While still in high school, Fullbright performed at the Woody Guthrie Folk Festival in Okemah. In 2009 he released the album Live at the Blue Door and three years later released his first studio album, From the Ground Up, which received a Grammy nomination in the category Best Americana Album. He has been the subject of two segments on NPR and was a 2012 winner of ASCAP Foundation's Harold Adamson Lyric Award.

== Early life ==
Fullbright grew up on an 80-acre farm in Okemah, Oklahoma. He began playing the piano at age five and taking piano lessons at the age nine. Fullbright attended public school in Okemah, Oklahoma, and graduated from Okemah High School. While still in high school he performed in an Okemah restaurant using an amplifier borrowed from the school band and made his debut performance at the Woody Guthrie Folk Festival.

Fullbright briefly attended Southeastern Oklahoma State University in Durant, Oklahoma, but left college to work with musician Mike McClure. A year later, after appearing on McClure's 2008 release did7, Fullbright began his solo career.

== Early career: 2008–2012 ==
Fullbright got his start in the music industry as a member of the Oklahoma band the Turnpike Troubadours also from the Okemah area.

He performed an Oklahoma City venue called The Blue Door for the first time in April 2008. Live at the Blue Door was recorded by Travis Linville on February 17, 2009, his fourth appearance at the venue, the night before he left for the 2009 Folk Alliance Conference in Memphis. The owner of the club later became Fullbright's manager. In 2012 Fullbright's performance at the SXSW was described as being "as perfect as if it were a Jonathan Demme concert film." In June, he played the main stage at the Kerrville Folk Festival and in July at the Woody Guthrie Folk Festival's Pastures of Plenty main stage. The music reviewer at No Depression wrote in her blog: "People who hadn’t heard Fullbright previously were stopped in their tracks by the brilliance of this 24-year-old whose mature lyrics have an immediate impact."

Fullbright's debut studio release From the Ground Up – released on May 8, 2012 – was recorded and mixed at 115 Recording in Norman, Oklahoma, with producer/engineer Wes Sharon. The title of the release pays homage to the farmhouse where he grew up. Fullbright states: "Every song on this record was written in that house, and I was kind of written in that house." In the studio with his backing musicians, Fullbright was almost immediately captivated by what he was hearing. Although he initially thought he would leave the studio with a demo record, he says: "We got lost in it in those three hours we were recording. We all looked at each other and thought, ‘No, this is the record. It’s not going to get any better than this anywhere else."

Favorable reviews include The Washington Times which said: "From the Ground Up proves to be a killer debut, pairing sharply worded stories that resonate with confident performances that pop." The album peaked at No. 10 on the Billboard Top Folk Albums chart for the week of June 9, 2012.

Fullbright performed at a Rock and Roll Hall of Fame tribute concert honoring Chuck Berry on October 27, 2012. The concert – part of the Hall's American Music Masters Series – took place in Cleveland at the State Theater. Fullbright played keyboard and harmonica on "Downbound Train." In his review of the show for Cleveland Scene, Jeff Niesel wrote: "While the New York Dolls David Johansen and Motorhead's Lemmy Kilmister brought star power to the show, it was little known Americana singer-pianist John Fullbright who really shined on his contribution, a moody rendition of "Downbound Train."

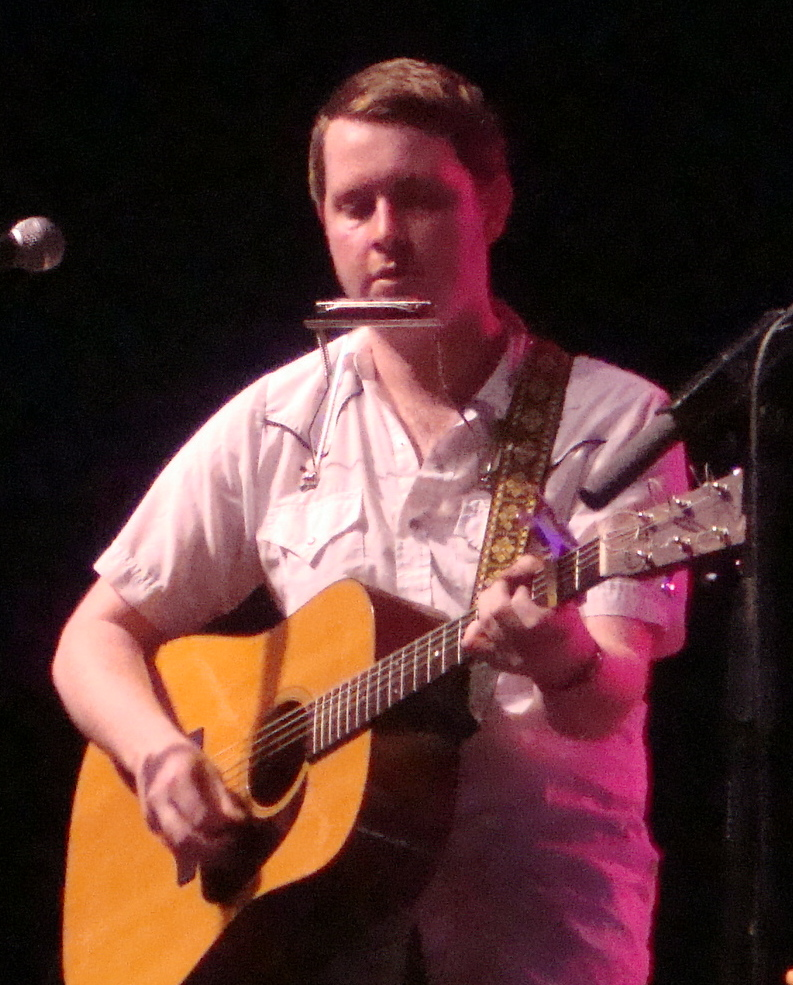
Fullbright performing at the Woody Guthrie Folk Festival

On December 5, 2012, From the Ground Up was nominated for a Grammy Award in the category Best Americana Album. Fullbright says that he was scrubbing his bathtub when he learned that From the Ground Up – which he says co-producer Wes Sharon refers to as "the little record that could" – had received a Grammy nomination. Fullbright performed "Gawd Above" at the Grammy Pre-Telecast show which was streamed live on the Grammy Awards website.

Fullbright received the ASCAP Harold Adamson Lyric Award at the 17th Annual ASCAP Foundation Awards Ceremony held in New York City on December 12, 2012.

== Career: 2013–2015 ==
In early 2013, Fullbright toured the United Kingdom. His first performance in London was a sell-out show at The Slaughtered Lamb. In September 2013, Fullbright performed at the 12th Annual Americana Music Association awards show in Nashville, where he was a nominee in the Emerging Artist of the Year category. Also in 2013, "Gawd Above" was included on the soundtrack of the movie August: Osage County, the film based on Tracy Letts' play set in Oklahoma. The soundtrack also includes tracks from Eric Clapton, Bon Iver, Kings of Leon and Gustavo Santaolalla.

Fullbright's sophomore release Songs was released in May 2014. Within a week of its release, several favorable reviews appeared. In his review for The Wall Street Journal, Jim Fusilli wrote, "Songs is a warm, winning and plainspoken Americana album that builds on the authority and charm of From the Ground Up not by musical-muscle flexing, but by its clarity and simmering intensity." In her review for American Songwriter, Lynne Margolis wrote, "Neil Young was 24 when he released After the Gold Rush. Joni Mitchell recorded Blue at 27. Years from now, after it stands the test of time, John Fullbright's Songs could take its place in that same pantheon of hallowed musical masterpieces." In his review for the Los Angeles Times, Randy Lewis wrote, "The simplicity of the album's title is a harbinger of what it contains – songs impressively and potently economical, mostly stripped to the emotional essence through poetically concise lyrics and heart-rending musical settings." In her review for NPR's All Things Considered, Meredith Ochs wrote, "So what makes John Fulbright good enough to prompt comparisons to the likes of Townes Van Zandt. Maybe it's his voice, provocative and world weary beyond his years or his melodies that play gently and continuously in your head, long after his new album reaches the end. Or his spacious and sometimes unexpected arrangements that let the songs breathe on their own accord, like they do on this one."

On June 27, 2014, the Oklahoma Music Hall of Fame presented Fullbright with its Rising Star award at an awards ceremony in Muskogee, Oklahoma.

Fullbright's first major exposure on American national television occurred when he performed on The Late Show with David Letterman on August 28, 2014.

== Career: Since 2016 ==
At the 19th annual Woody Guthrie Folk Festival in July 2016, Fullbright was not only the Saturday night headliner at the Pastures of Plenty, but also joined several other artists on stage during the festival, accompanying David Amram, as well as performing during tribute sets to Bob Childers and Tom Skinner.

During the 2017 Woody Guthrie Folk Festival, Fullbright was one of many performers along with Andy Adams, the Burns Sisters, Michael Fracasso, Jaimee Harris, Greg Jacobs, Levi Parham, Joel Rafael and the Red Dirt Rangers who performed at a tribute for Jimmy LaFave, festival-regular and board member, who had died two months earlier.

In 2018 Fullbright shifted his focus to the production and recording spectrum while also intermittently touring. In particular, he produced the album Things Change for the Raleigh, North Carolina–based Americana group American Aquarium.

Earlier in his career he commented on the pressure of recording new material while meeting the standard set by previous pieces of work. "I'd be lying if I said I didn't," Fullbright told the Tulsa World. "It's a little bit manic in the sense that when I'm under pressure, I'm under pressure. But if I sit and think about it long enough, I realize that the pressure doesn't really exist and then I'm not under pressure. It wanes and waxes back and forth between being terrified and being overconfident."

== Discography ==
Year	Title	Peak chart positions								Label
Year	Title	US	US Folk	US Heat	US Indie	US Rock	SCO	UK	UK Indie	Label
2022	The Liar	—	—	—	—	—	—	—	—	Blue Dirt Records
2014	Songs	94	6	—	28	12	77	101	15	Blue Dirt Records
2012	From the Ground Up	—	10	20	—	—	—	—	—	Blue Dirt Records
2009	Live at the Blue Door	—	—	—	—	—	—	—	—	Blue Dirt Records

== Awards and nominations ==
Year	Association/Award	Category	Result
2014	Oklahoma Music Hall of Fame	Rising Star Award	Won
2013	55th Grammy Awards	Best Americana Album – From the Ground Up	Nominated
2013	Americana Music Association	Emerging Artist of the Year	Nominated
2012	ASCAP	Harold Adamson Lyric Award	Won
