= The Peterson Brothers =

- Origin: Austin, Texas, U.S.
- Genres: Soul, Funk, Blues, Jazz, R&B
- Members: Glenn Peterson, Jr.; Alex Peterson
- Website: www.petersonbrothersband.com

The Peterson Brothers are an American soul, funk, blues and jazz band featuring brothers Glenn Peterson Jr. on vocals and lead guitar and Alex Peterson on bass.

The Austin Chronicle writes that: "Bastrop upstarts the Peterson Brothers have been tearing up the stage at the Continental Club since they were both teens." The brothers played their first gig with blues legend Pinetop Perkins 10 years ago.

The Peterson Brothers have been described by Jamfeed as "Some of the most talented musicians I have seen come out of Austin." American Blues Scene writes: "they've become one of the most popular festival fixtures in the US, in just 10 years." Their festival gigs have included Austin City Limits, Chicago Blues Fest, Minneapolis State Fair and Old Settler's Music Fest. In September, 2019 they performed at Crossroads Village at Eric Clapton's Crossroads Guitar Festival in Dallas.

The Minneapolis Star Tribune described a Peterson Brothers festival set "like a NASCAR race" with a "crescendoing jam through the Dramatics' What You See Is What You Get or the version of Al Green's Take Me to the River that sounded like it originated on Stevie Wonder's Innervisions — all with Glenn soloing on guitar with the same flashy but fulfilling approach as their recent tourmate Gary Clark Jr."

== Influences ==
In addition to Gary Clark Jr., who The Peterson Brothers performed Come Together with at the 2019 Austin City Limits Festival, they have opened for and played with Robert Randolph and the Family Band, Kenny Wayne Shepherd, Buddy Guy and B.B. King. They've told interviewers that their music career grew from digging through garage sale albums their mother and grandmother brought home, and learning the classics of funk, soul, blues and rock.

On PBS Newshour Oct. 2019, Gary Clark Jr. talked about Austin musicians on his radar: "The Peterson Brothers is a brother duo and they play bass and guitar—some of the baddest cats in the world."

The Peterson Brothers' EP The Intro was released Jan. 25, 2020 at Native Hostel in Austin, Texas. Buddy Magazine wrote that the EP "marks the latest stage in the evolution of the Peterson Brothers, a coming of age." And The Austin Statesman wrote: "The time is ripe for them to reach for another level, and "The Intro" (true to its name) seems designed toward that end."

== Band members ==
- Glenn Peterson Jr - Guitar, vocals, drums
- Alex Peterson - Bass guitar, vocals, violin

== Albums ==
- The Peterson Brothers (2015) (Blue Point Records) [B014W0DA9Q]
- Give Me Your Love (Nov. 27, 2019) Single (Independent) [B081TRBXGG]
- The Intro (EP Jan. 25, 2020) (Independent) [B083ZQS1BD]
