= Beth Bombara =

American singer-songwriter

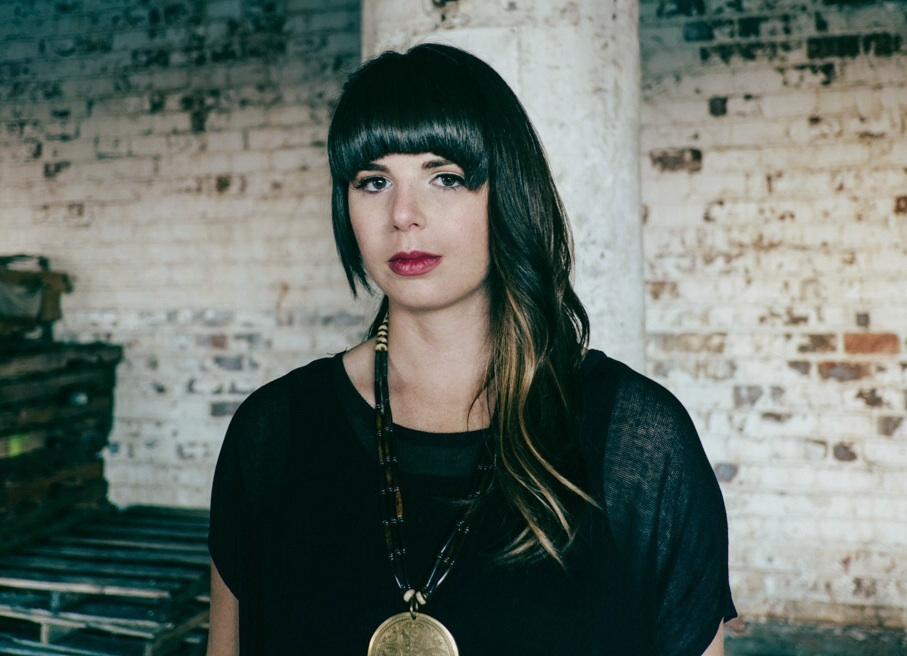
- Bombara in 2013

Background information
- Born: August 4, 1983 (age 41)
- Origin: Grand Rapids, Michigan, United States
- Genres: Americana, Singer-Songwriter, indie rock, Folk, Blues
- Instrument(s): Voice, Guitar, Piano, Bass guitar, Drums
- Years active: 2007–present
- Website: www.bethbombara.com

Beth Bombara (born August 4, 1983) is an independent American singer, songwriter and musician from Grand Rapids, Michigan. She currently resides in St. Louis, Missouri.

== Early life and education ==
Bombara was born and raised in Grand Rapids, Michigan. Her first instrument was the piano, taking lessons from grades 3 through 8. Just before attending high school, she expressed interest in her mother’s electric guitar. Her mother gave her the instrument and a book of chords and she began to teach herself how to play. The guitar became her primary instrument from that point forward.

While attending Jenison High School in Michigan, Bombara formed a punk rock band called Green Means Go. After practicing and writing a few songs together, the band began to play local shows for audiences, gaining a small but loyal following. The band continued into her college years, performing from 1999 until 2005.

After high school, Bombara attended Cornerstone University in Grand Rapids and Greenville College in Greenville, Illinois, earning an interdisciplinary major in Music & Culture.

A turning point in her education and life occurred in 2004, while attending a program at The Contemporary Music Center on Martha’s Vineyard. She was assigned to write and record music with a fellow student who would later become her primary collaborator and husband, Kit Hamon. Bombara and Hamon were married in 2009.

== Early career ==
After graduating from Greenville College in 2006, Bombara was invited back to The Contemporary Music Center for an Artist Residency in the spring of 2006. There, she met Samantha Crain, and in the summer of 2006, moved to Oklahoma to tour with Crain's band, Samantha Crain and the Midnight Shivers. She continued to tour with Crain until late 2007.

== Solo career ==
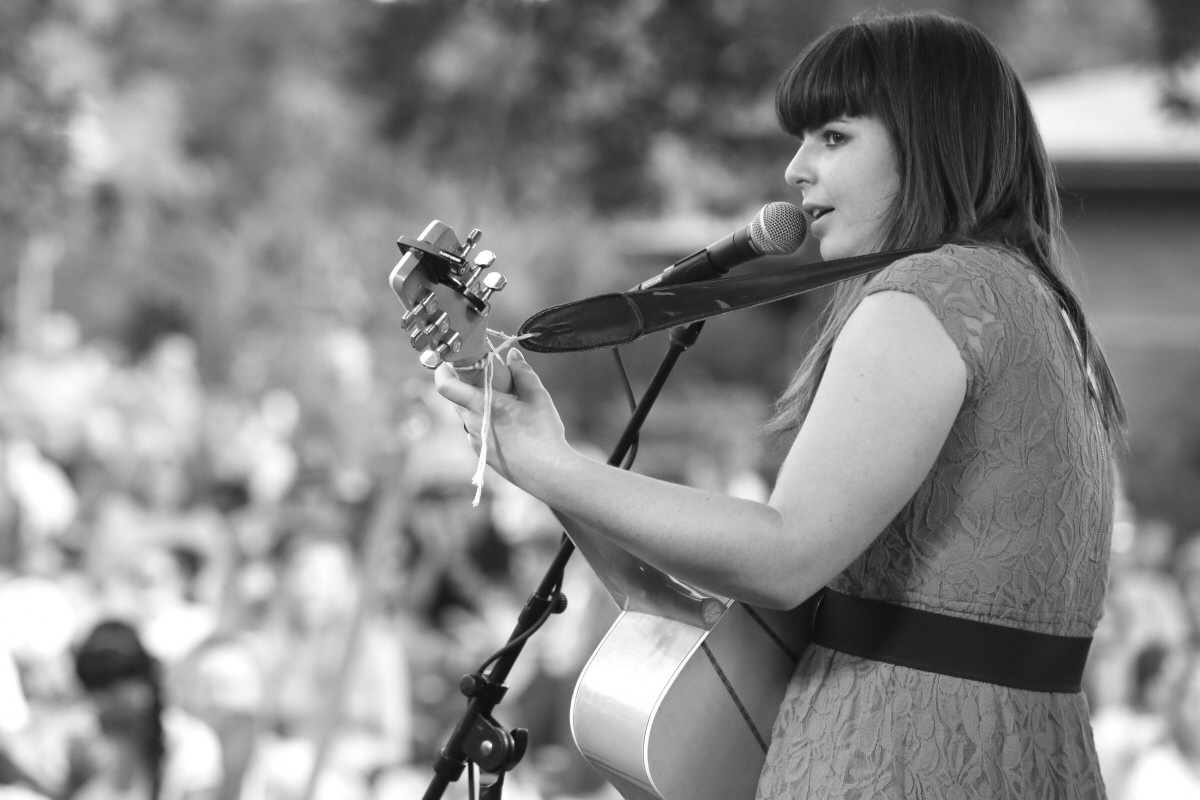
Beth Bombara performing at the Missouri Botanical Garden

After moving to St. Louis in late 2007, Bombara began her solo career. She began performing at the Chippewa Chapel Open Mic Night at St. Louis music venue Off Broadway. Later that year, she released her first solo EP, Abandon Ship. The EP was met with solid reviews. Music blog Wildy's World said, "Abandon Ship is a stunning EP that deserves a lot wider distribution and notice than it's already received."

In 2009, Bombara joined with husband Kit Hamon, as well as musician and brother-in-law JJ Hamon to record indie-rock album Beth Bombara and The Robotic Foundation, briefly changing the name of the band to match the album title. This was short-lived, and future work was all released under her solo name. This album, too, received critical acclaim with critics praising the album's darker tone.

Bombara was an early adopter of the crowdfunding website Kickstarter to fund the creation of her first full-length album in 2010, Wish I Were You, which she released on CD as well as a vinyl LP. To promote the album, Bombara toured the American Midwest and Southwest. Reviews at the time singled out the growing power of her vocals, with one critic saying, "It also helps that Bombara's ever-strengthening vocals — which rarely falter across registers or emotional nuances — are pushed to the front, allowing her well-placed hiccups and proclamations to land with clarity."

After an appearance on the Chevy Music Showcase, The Mid-America Chevy Dealers in St. Louis provided a new Suburban for the band as they began their next tour.

In July 2013, Bombara released the EP Raise Your Flag. It proved to be her greatest critical success to date, called "Soulful and unsettling in the best sort of way, 'Raise Your Flag' gets under your skin, inside your spirit and makes you stare your sins straight in the eye."

On the success of this release, Bombara was invited to play to an audience of over 10,000 at the Whitaker Music Festival in the Missouri Botanical Garden, was featured on Living St. Louis on PBS-affiliated KETC-TV, and was the subject of a local interest news story on KSDK-TV.

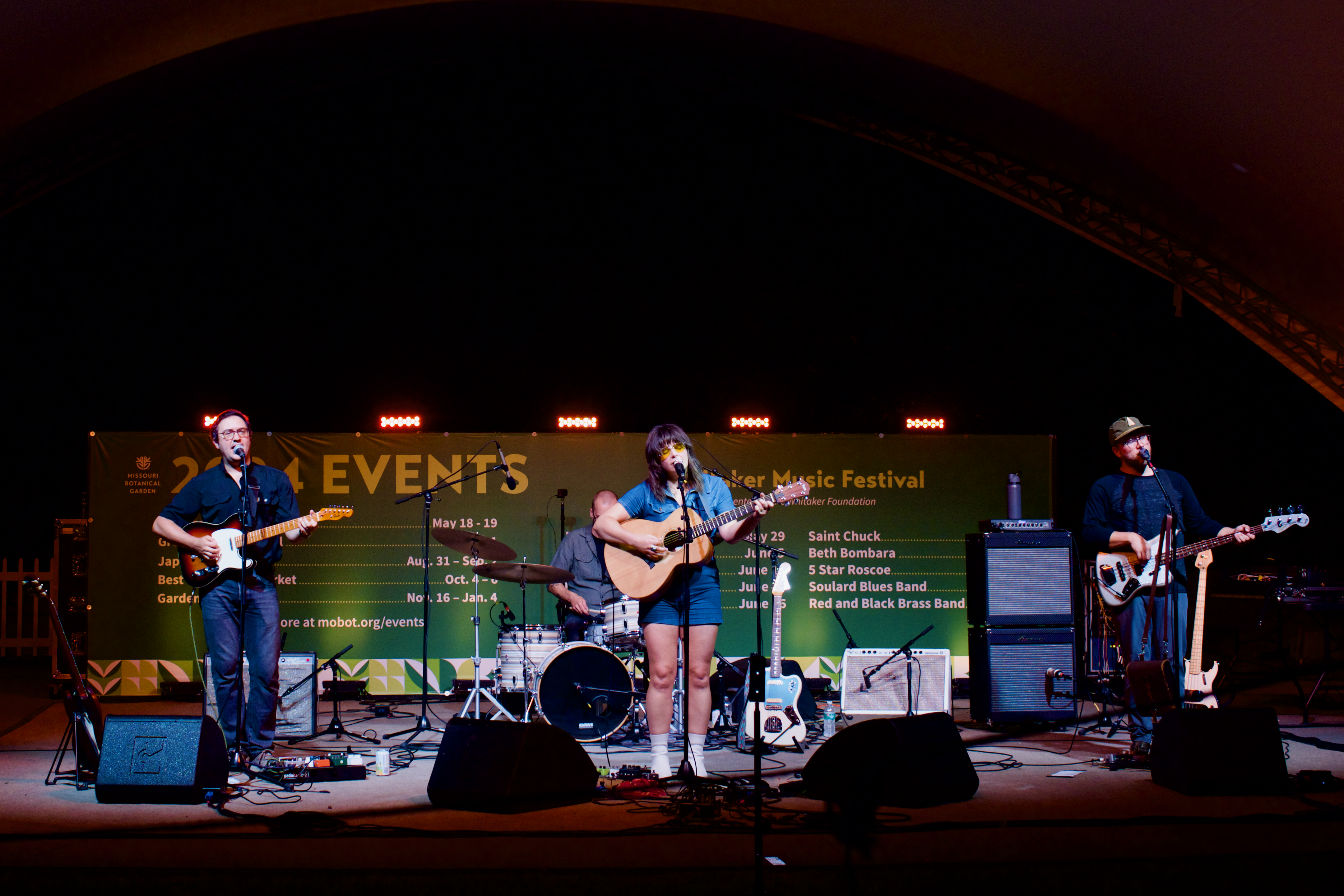
Beth Bombara at the Whitaker Music Festival 2024

Three songs from Raise Your Flag were released as music videos in January 2014: Long Dark Hallelujah, Mountain Sun and Right My Wrongs. These videos were filmed and directed by Joshua Black Wilkins with assistance from Nate Burrell, and edited by Kyle Jones. Mountain Sun and Long Dark Hallelujah featured Bombara and Kit Hamon in solo performance, while Right My Wrongs added bandmates JJ Hamon and Karl Eggers.

In June 2015, Bombara released her eponymous fifth album, Beth Bombara. The 11-track LP was supported by an animated video for the track "In The Water", and an in-studio music video for "Promised Land". The album featured a more prominent blending of styles than previous efforts, and received critical praise: "All told, this is a great album. There’s a lovely balance of variety and consistency, ultimately taking listeners on a mood-altering journey through love, joy, pain, and sadness. It’s the kind of album that a troubadour should be proud to have put together...It’s got all of the elements of a complex songwriter, adventuring through life with her keen ears and eyes open to the best of human stories."

== Other projects ==
In addition to her solo career, Bombara has also played and performed vocals with Samantha Crain, Cassie Morgan and the Lonely Pine, and Old Lights.

== Awards and recognition ==
- The Riverfront Times Best Singer/Songwriter 2012
- The Riverfront Times Best Americana Artist 2014
- The Riverfront Times Best Americana Artist 2015

== Discography ==
Beth Bombara

Title	Released	Label	Details
Abandon Ship EP	30 October 2007	Eyeteeth Records	
Beth Bombara and The Robotic Foundation	21 April 2009	Eyeteeth Records	
Wish I Were You	23 November 2010	Self released	
Raise Your Flag EP	2 July 2013	Self released	
Beth Bombara	23 June 2015	Self released	
Map & No Direction	3 March 2017	Lemp Electric	
EverGreen	9 August 2019	Lemp Electric	
Revolution 1 (Single)	2 October 2020	Lemp Electric	Beatles cover
Space Junk (Single)	5 November 2021	Lemp Electric	
It All Goes Up	4 August 2023	Black Mesa Records	
Love Is a Long Road (Single)	22 December 2023	Lemp Electric	Tom Petty cover
As You Like It EP	10 June 2024		

with Samantha Crain and the Midnight Shivers

Title	Details
The Confiscation EP	Released 2007 (Self released)

with Cassie Morgan and the Lonely Pine

Title	Details
Weathered Hands, Weary Eyes	Released 27 April 2010 (Self released)

with Old Lights

Title	Details
Like Strangers EP	Released 9 August 2011 (Self released)
