= John Moreland =

American musician (born 1985)

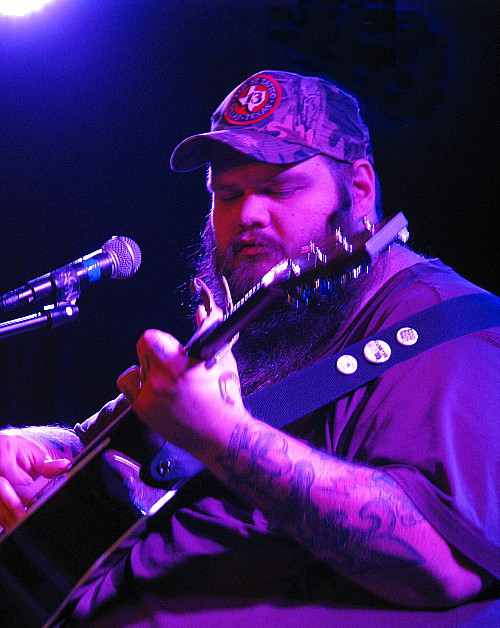
- John Moreland performing during the Asbury Acoustic Cafe series at The Saint in Asbury Park, NJ on June 9, 2015.

Background information
- Born: Longview, Texas, U.S.
- Origin: Tulsa, Oklahoma, U.S.
- Genres: Americana; Folk rock Alternative country
- Occupation: Singer-songwriter
- Instruments: Vocals acoustic guitar bass guitar harmonica organ dobro
- Years active: 2000–present
- Labels: Last Chance Records; Okie Tone Records; Little Mafia Records; 4AD
- Members: Mike Williams; John Calvin Abney; Steve Walden
- Website: JohnMoreland.net

John Moreland is an American singer-songwriter from Tulsa, Oklahoma.

== Early life ==
Moreland was born in Longview, Texas. Moreland's father worked for Sunoco as an electrical engineer, and because of this job the family moved a lot. His was a conservative Southern Baptist family. When he was a baby they moved to Northern Kentucky, across the river from Cincinnati, Ohio. Moreland credits his love for the Cincinnati Reds to this time in Kentucky.

When Moreland was 10 years old Moreland's family moved from Boone County, Kentucky to Tulsa, Oklahoma and, with the help of his father, he started playing the guitar. When he was 12 or 13 he started playing with a child he went to church with who wrote songs and inspired him to start writing songs.

== Career ==
Moreland played in his first show when he was 13 or 14 years old. In the early 2000s during high school, Moreland played in local punk and hardcore bands, including local metalcore Oklahoma band, Thirty Called Arson.

Moreland put together the Black Gold Band in 2005, and released Endless Oklahoma Sky on Oklahoma City label Little Mafia Records in 2008. In 2009, he recorded the follow-up Things I Can't Control at Armstrong Recording in Tulsa with producer and musician Stephen Egerton (Descendents, All).

Largely self-performed and self-produced, Moreland produces music that is influenced by his Oklahoma roots. Moreland has released a constant stream of records (in 2011 he released two full-length albums and two EPs), saying "I write a lot of songs. And I guess I feel like your most recent release kind of represents you." Moreland has cited Steve Earle as his "gateway" to folk music. He switched genres from hardcore to folk when he heard Earle's song "Rich Man's War". His father was also a big Earle fan. Other influences were Guy Clark and Townes Van Zandt.

Moreland runs his own mail order business and ships his own records (packing the records, taking them to the post office himself) because all of his favorite labels (Ebullition Records, Level Plane Records, Dischord Records) used that method.

In 2015, Moreland released High on Tulsa Heat, his third full-length solo record release. It was produced by Moreland and features Jesse Aycock, John Calvin Abney, Chris Foster, Jared Tyler, and Kierston White. The album was recorded quickly and informally over the course of a few days in July 2014. Moreland used his parents' home in Bixby, Oklahoma, as a studio while they were out of town on vacation. A video of the song "Cherokee" was conceived and shot by Joey Kneiser, and features bass player Bingham Barnes. Both are from the band Glossary. Moreland said the song was inspired by a dream.

Moreland participates in the Folk Alliance International Conference, a non-profit folk music conference that is held annually in Kansas City, Kansas. He participated in fellow singer-songwriter Jason Isbell's 2013 national tour.

In 2017, Moreland released his seventh album, Big Bad Luv, on 4AD. The title is a nod to the book by that name by Larry Brown. The record is the first where Moreland recorded with a full band. Musicians from the bands Dawes (Griffin and Taylor Goldsmith) and Shovels And Rope (Carrie Ann Hearst and Michael Trent) contributed vocals.

His fifth solo album, LP5, was released February 7, 2020. Produced by Matt Pence of Centro-Matic, it marks his return to the label Thirty Tigers after his previous release via 4AD.

In 2025, Moreland won the Overall Grand Prize in the 30th Annual USA Songwriting Competition with his song "Visitor", he also won Best Folk Award.

== Performance style ==
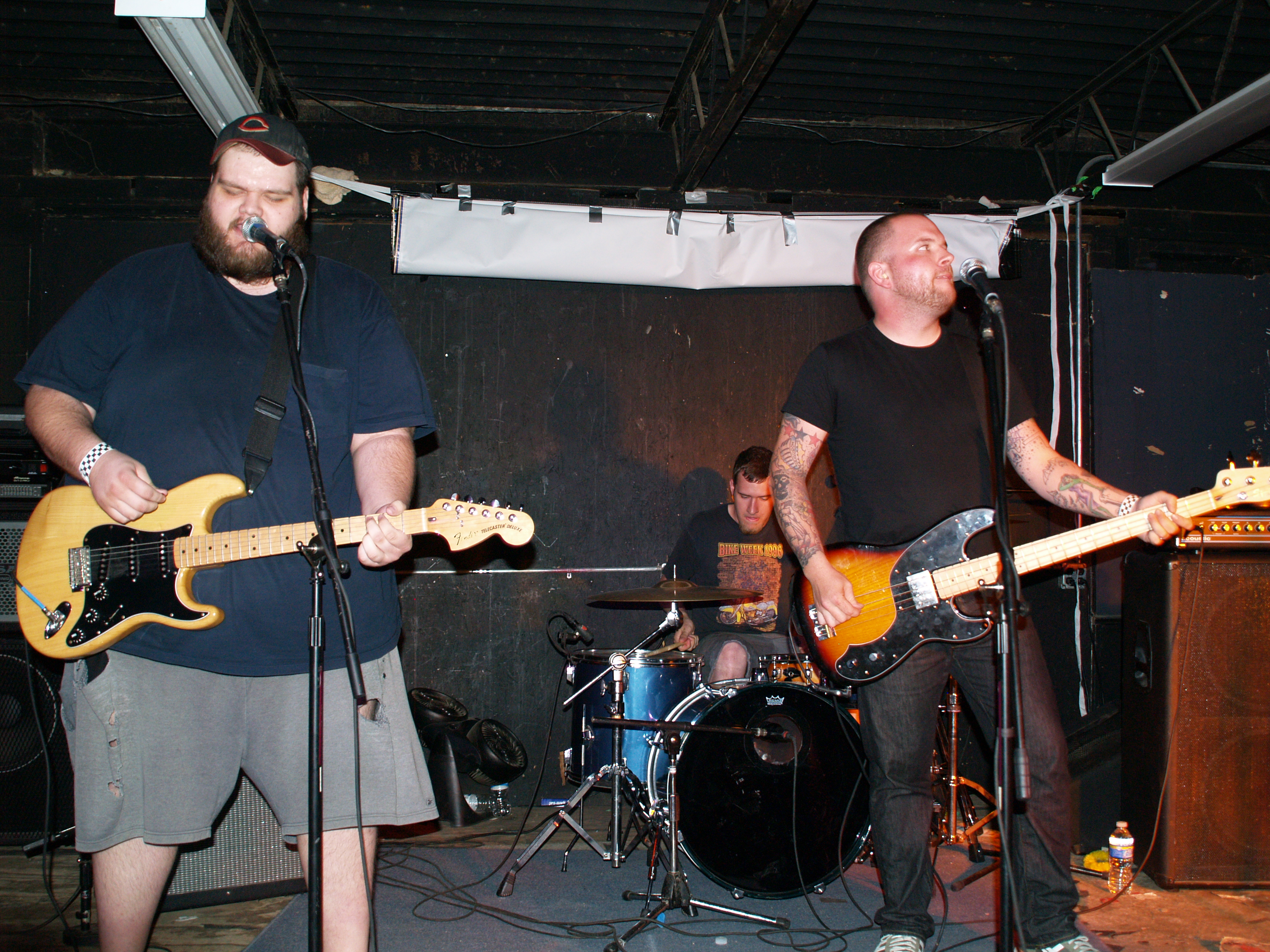
John Moreland and the Black Gold Band Oklahoma City Conservatory (June 14, 2009)

Moreland sometimes plays solo with an acoustic guitar, but was often accompanied by two different bands: the Black Gold Band (now defunct) or the Dust Bowl Souls. Though his earlier music was more rock-based, his more recent releases are characterized as being sparsely acoustic.

He is characterized as a songwriter's songwriter. American television host and political commentator Rachel Maddow tweeted praise of Moreland's work: "If the American music business made any sense, guys like John Moreland would be household names." Moreland posits that Maddow probably saw him opening for Lucero, a band Maddow likes. Moreland jokes that her remark was "the first time his dad has agreed with Rachel Maddow." During the summer of 2015, Moreland opened for Jason Isbell, Dawes, and Patty Griffin.

== Sons of Anarchy ==
Three of Moreland's songs, "Heaven", "Gospel", and "Your Spell", have been featured on the TV show, Sons of Anarchy.

== Personal life ==
Moreland is married to visual artist Pearl Rachinsky, who did the album layout for Big Bad Luv.

Around 2015, Moreland relocated to Norman, Oklahoma but then later that year moved back to Tulsa.

== Discography ==
Studio albums

- 2008: Endless Oklahoma Sky with the Black Gold Band
- 2011: Things I Can't Control with the Black Gold Band
- 2011: Everything the Hard Way with the Dust Bowl Souls
- 2011: Earthbound Blues (Memorial)
- 2013: In the Throes (Last Chance Records)
- 2015: High on Tulsa Heat (Old Omens / Thirty Tigers)
- 2017: Big Bad Luv (4AD)
- 2020: LP5 (Old Omens)
- 2022: Birds in the Ceiling
- 2024: Visitor

EPs / Singles / Other

- 2010: Hope Springs Ephemeral EP (Memorial)
- 2011: Tear Me Back Apart / Blues & Kudzu 7" (Little Mafia)
- 2014: Wax Packs 7" split w/ Austin Lucas: John Moreland – "Cataclysm Blues No. 4" / Austin Lucas – "Splinters" (Secret Audio Club)

Moreland also appears on the following:

- 2010: The Seven Degrees of Stephen Egerton – "Abundance of Fluff"
