= Silverada =

American country band

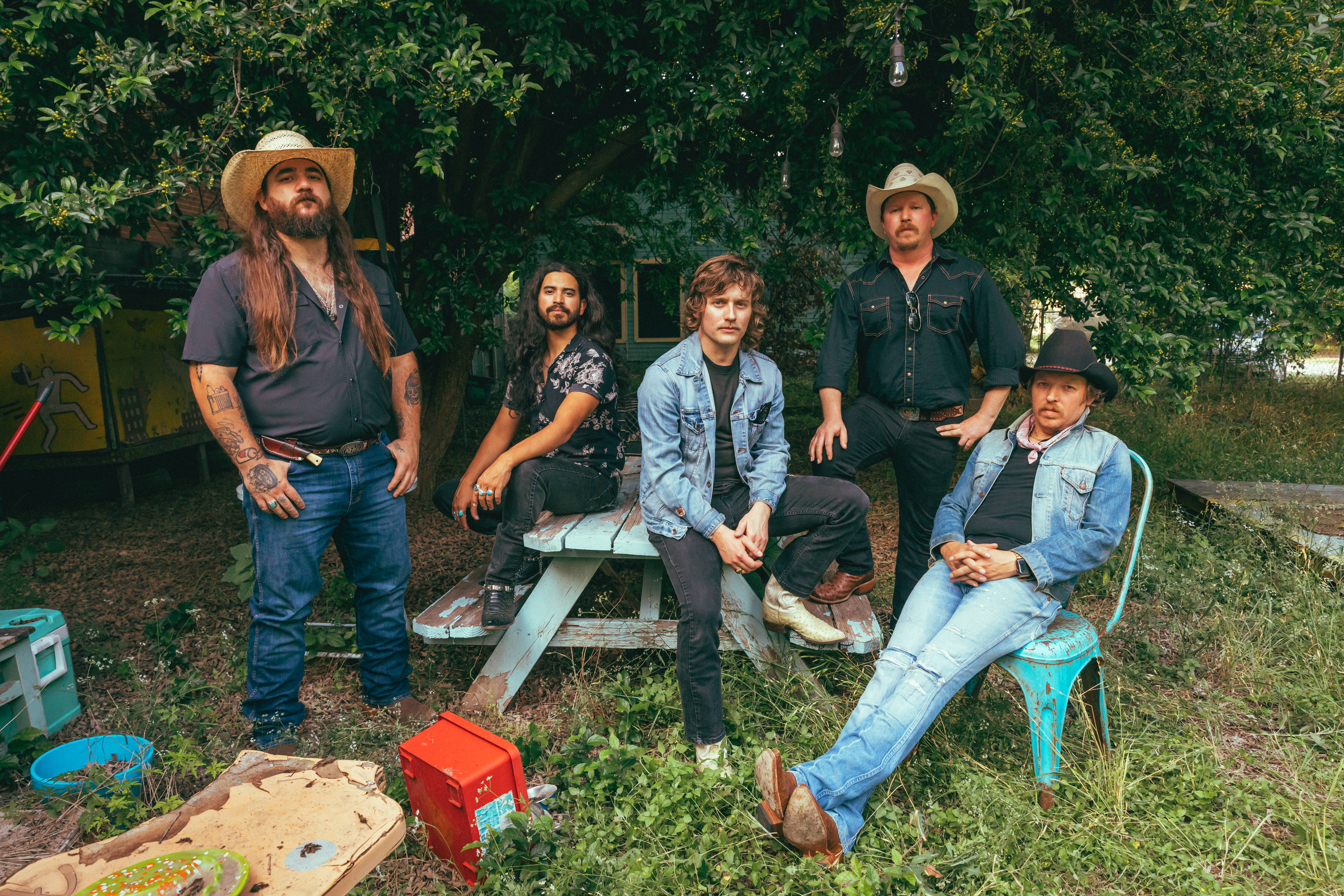
- Mike and the Moonpies in Austin, Texas, May 2023

Background information
- Also known as: Mike and the Moonpies
- Origin: Austin, Texas, U.S.
- Genres: Neotraditional country; Americana
- Years active: 2007–present
- Label: Prairie Rose Records
- Members: Mike Harmeier; Catlin Rutherford; Omar Oyoque; Taylor Englert; Parker Twomey
- Website: www.silverada.com

Silverada (until 2024 Mike and the Moonpies) is an American neotraditional country and Americana band based in Austin, Texas. It was formed by singer-songwriter Mike Harmeier in 2007. Its members are singer and guitarist Harmeier, drummer Taylor Englert, guitarist Catlin Rutherford, keyboard player Parker Twomey, and bassist Omar Oyoque.

== History ==
Mike and the Moonpies was formed in Austin, Texas, in 2007 by singer-songwriter Mike Harmeier. Initially a recording project with a rotating cast of local musicians, the group gained a following during a Monday night residency at The Hole in the Wall, a dive bar near the University of Texas campus. The "classic" lineup solidified in 2009 when lead guitarist Catlin Rutherford and pedal steel player Zachary Moulton folded their previous band, The Doolins, to join Harmeier full-time. With the addition of drummer Kyle Ponder and bassist Preston Rhone, the core quintet was established and released their debut album, The Real Country, in 2010.

In May 2020, Mike and the Moonpies released Touch of You: The Lost Songs of Gary Stewart, an album of unreleased songs written or co-written by American honky-tonk musician and songwriter Gary Stewart. The band's version of Stewart's "Smooth Shot of Whiskey", featuring Mark Wystrach of the band Midland, was released as a single.

Mike and the Moonpies made their Grand Ole Opry debut on September 6, 2022.

In January 2024, the band announced that they were changing the band's name from Mike and the Moonpies to Silverada. Lead singer Mike Harmeier stated that he had considered a name change for over a decade, but finalized the decision to coincide with the release of the band's 2024 self-titled album. During the transition, the band evaluated a list of more than two hundred potential names via a group text chain before selecting Silverada.

== Band members ==
Current members

- Mike Harmeier – lead vocals, acoustic/electric guitar (2007–present)
- Catlin Rutherford – lead guitar (2009–present)
- Omar Oyoque – bass guitar (2018–present)
- Taylor Englert – drums (2022–present)
- Parker Twomey - keyboards (2025-present)

Former members

- Zach Moulton – pedal steel guitar (2009–2025)
- Kyle Ponder – drums (2009–2022)
- John Carbone – keyboards (2011–2020)
- Preston Rhone – bass guitar (2009–2018)

== Discography ==
=== Albums ===
Studio albums

- The Real Country (2010)
- Hard Way (2012)
- Mockingbird (2015)
- Steak Night at the Prairie Rose (2018)
- Cheap Silver & Solid Country Gold (2019)
- Touch of You: The Lost Songs of Gary Stewart (2020)
- One to Grow On (2021)
- Silverada (2024)
- Texas 42 (2025)
- Living Proof (2026)

Live albums

- Live at WinStar World Casino & Resort (2016)
- Live from the Devil's Backbone (2023)

=== Music videos ===
Year	Video
2016	"Smoke 'Em If You Got 'Em"
2016	"Mockingbird"
2017	"Country Music's Dead"
2017	"Road Crew"
2018	"Beaches of Biloxi"
2022	"Hour on the Hour"

== Charts ==
Year	Album	US Heatseekers Albums (Billboard)	Label
2018	Steak Night at the Prairie Rose	22	Prairie Rose Records

== Tours ==
- European Tour (2023)
- West Coast Tour (2023)
- Roadshow Tour (2024)
- Unlit Matches Tour (2025)
- Leave Em Wanting Tour (2025–2026)
