= Turnpike Troubadours =

American country music band

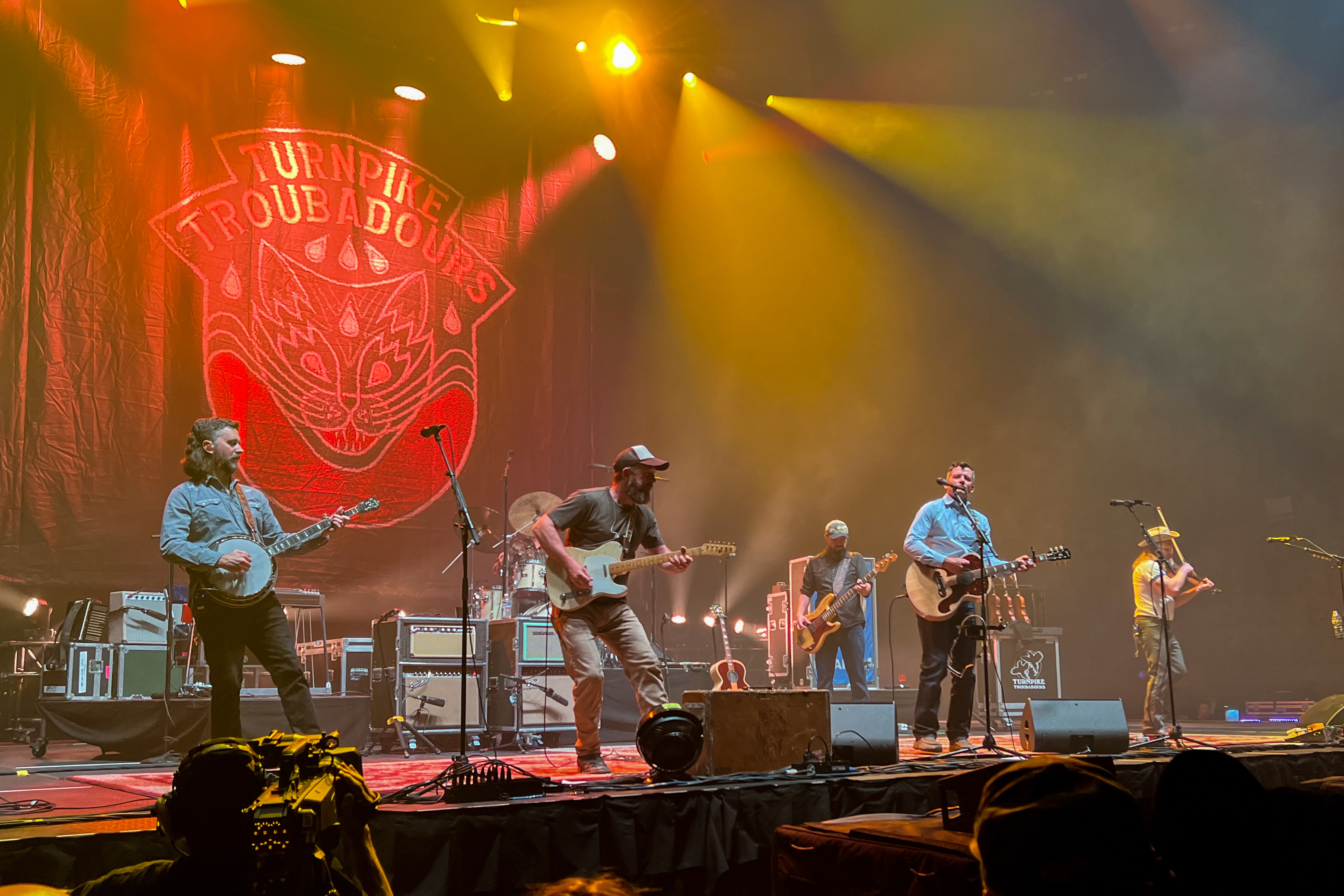
- Turnpike Troubadours performing in 2023. L–R: Early, Engleman, Pearson (behind drum kit), Edwards, Felker, Nix.

Background information
- Origin: Tahlequah, Oklahoma, U.S.
- Genres: Red dirt; Americana; honky-tonk; neotraditional country
- Years active: 2007–2019; 2021–present
- Labels: Bossier City Records; Thirty Tigers
- Members: RC Edwards; Kyle Nix; Ryan Engleman; Evan Felker; Gabriel Pearson; Hank Early
- Past members: John Fullbright; Casey Sliger; Chad Masters; Giovanni Carnuccio III; Luke Savage
- Website: turnpiketroubadours.com

The Turnpike Troubadours are an American country music band from Tahlequah, Oklahoma, founded in 2005. They started their own imprint, Bossier City Records, in 2007 and have released seven studio albums. Their self-titled 2015 album peaked at number 17 on the Billboard 200.

== History ==
The band was formed in 2005 by Evan Felker and R.C. Edwards. Their debut album, Bossier City, was recorded a month after the formation of the band, in order to have a recording to sell at live shows. Felker later said the musical arrangements were "not a good representation" of what the band later became.

Their sophomore album, Diamonds & Gasoline, followed in 2010.

The songs "Easton and Main" and "Bossier City" were re-recorded for their 2015 self-titled album. The album peaked at number three on the Billboard Top Country Albums chart.

In October 2017, the album A Long Way from Your Heart was released, peaking at number three on the Billboard Top Country Albums chart.

Following a string of poor performances in late 2018, stemming from Felker's insobriety, the band was forced to cancel 12 shows slated to be held in the weeks to follow, returning on November 30 to play at ACL Live. Felker's personal battles continued the following year, spurring the band to cancel all remaining tour dates. It left the band's future undecided but noting a possible return to the stage once "everyone is of strong mind, body and spirit and can deliver what our fans deserve."

In November 2021, the band's Instagram was cleaned of all previous posts and their website displayed only the band's logo and a message that read "Coming Soon". In January 2022, the band announced their long-awaited reunion and return to live performances, holding their first shows on April 8–9, 2022 at Cain's Ballroom. One month later, another two-night run of shows were held May 14–15 at Red Rocks Amphitheatre.

On August 25, 2023, the band released their album A Cat in the Rain after releasing three earlier singles: "Mean Old Sun," "Chipping Mill," and "Brought Me."

On April 11, 2025, the band released a surprise album The Price of Admission, an 11-track record dropped prior to The Boys of Oklahoma concerts with Cross Canadian Ragweed in Stillwater, OK. This is their sixth studio album, and the second produced by Shooter Jennings.

In 2026, they are the guest stars from the children's television in Yo Gabba Gabbaland in Season 2, they performed the song, Sunrise, Sunset.

== Musical style, composition, and influences ==
Critically, the Turnpike Troubadours' musical style has been labeled as primarily country music and its respective subgenres, such as red dirt, honky-tonk, Americana, neotraditional country, and country rock. Mark Deming of AllMusic referred to the Turnpike Troubadours as a "country-leaning roots rock band," with elements of political folk music, honky-tonk, bluegrass, Cajun music, and rock.

In an interview with the Chicago Tribune, band co-founder and bassist RC Edwards identified the band's musical style as honky-tonk.

== Band members ==
Current

- RC Edwards
- Kyle Nix
- Ryan Engleman
- Evan Felker
- Gabriel Pearson
- Hank Early

Past

- John Fullbright
- Casey Sliger
- Chad Masters
- Giovanni "Nooch" Carnuccio III
- Luke Savage

== Discography ==
=== Studio albums ===
Title	Album details	Peak chart positions					Sales
Title	Album details	US Country	US	US Indie	US Folk	US Rock	Sales
Bossier City	Release date: December 11, 2007; Label: Bossier City Records	—	—	—	—	—	
Diamonds & Gasoline	Release date: August 31, 2010; Label: Bossier City Records	—	—	—	—	—	
Goodbye Normal Street	Release date: May 8, 2012; Label: Bossier City Records/ Thirty Tigers	14	57	7	3	23	US: 66,000
The Turnpike Troubadours	Release date: September 18, 2015; Label: Bossier City Records	3	17	3	2	5	US: 34,800
A Long Way from Your Heart	Release date: October 20, 2017; Label: Bossier City Records	3	20	1	1	—	US: 29,100
A Cat in the Rain	Release date: August 25, 2023; Label: Bossier City Records	9	34	—	—	—	
The Price of Admission	Release date: April 11, 2025; Label: Bossier City Records	28	150	—	—	—	
"—" denotes releases that did not chart

=== Singles ===
List of singles, with selected peak chart positions
Title	Year	Peak chart positions	Album
Title	Year	US Country Airplay	Album
"Heaven Passing Through"	2025	46	The Price of Admission

=== Other charted songs ===
List of other charted songs, with selected chart positions, showing year released and album name
Title	Year	Peak chart positions						Album
Title	Year	US	US Country	US Rock	AUS	CAN	NZ Hot	Album
"Plainsman" (Zach Bryan featuring Turnpike Troubadours)	2026	45	14	14	87	24	9	Young Manhood and Other Donatable Organs

=== Music videos ===
Year	Video	Director
2012	"Gin, Smoke, Lies"	Brooke McDaniel
2015	"Down Here"	Brooke McDaniel
2023	"Mean Old Sun"	Sterlin Harjo
