= Evan Felker =

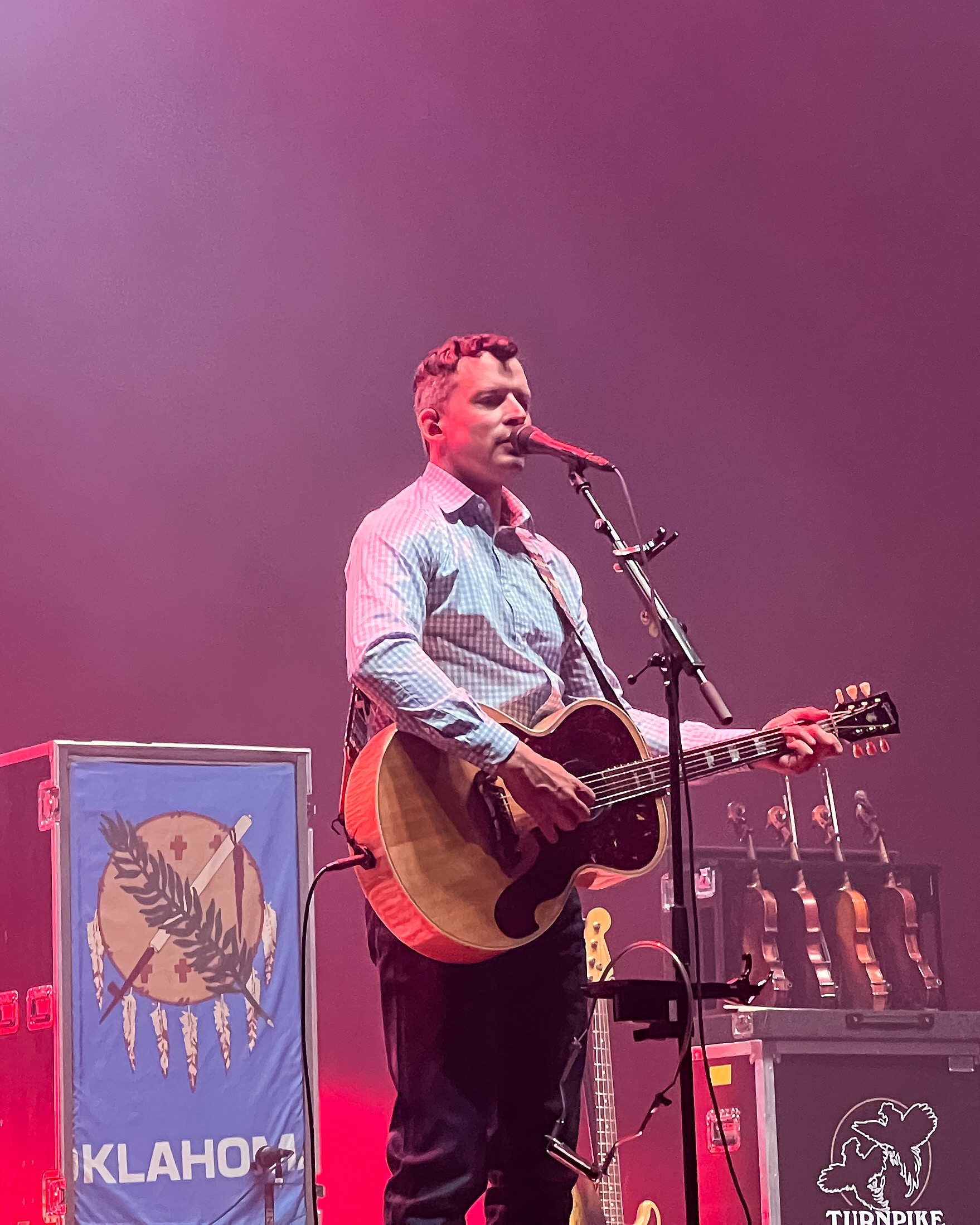
- Felker performing on-stage with the Turnpike Troubadours in Knoxville, Tennessee, November 2023.

Background information
- Born: Evan Duane Felker; March 24, 1984 (age 42); Okemah, Oklahoma, U.S.
- Genres: Red dirt; honky-tonk; Americana; neotraditional country; country rock; roots rock
- Occupations: Singer-songwriter, guitarist
- Instruments: Vocals, guitar, banjo, harmonica
- Years active: 2007–present
- Labels: Bossier City Records, Thirty Tigers
- Website: www.turnpiketroubadours.com

Evan Duane Felker (born March 24, 1984) is an American singer, songwriter and guitarist from Okemah, Oklahoma. He is best known as the lead singer of the band Turnpike Troubadours.

== Early life ==
Felker was born in Okemah and raised in Wright City, a small town in rural southeast Oklahoma. His mother, Tane, worked in the healthcare industry and his father, Van, was a cowboy. He has one younger sister, Cheyenne. He was part of "an outdoorsy family that did a lot of hunting and fishing". Growing up, Felker enjoyed short stories and wrote poems and creative prose. He started playing guitar at the age of fifteen, learning from books and from high school friends. He initially began writing rock songs since he considered country music to be uncool. Felker's uncle was a songwriter and rock musician, and Felker travelled to Tulsa, Oklahoma, as a teenager to watch him perform. Felker attended tech school to train as an electrician and later worked in paper mills, food plants, and Mercury Marine in Stillwater, Oklahoma.

== Career ==
When Felker moved to Stillwater, Oklahoma, in his twenties, he became interested in country music; his "heroes" were Cross Canadian Ragweed and Jason Boland. He and guitarist Ryan Engleman began playing as a two-man acoustic act and were joined by bass player R.C. Edwards two months later. Eventually, drummer Giovanni “Nooch” Carnuccio III and fiddler Kyle Nix joined, and formed the Turnpike Troubadours. The band later relocated to Tahlequah, Oklahoma.

The Turnpike Troubadours announced they were taking a hiatus in May 2019, saying they would not perform "until a time we feel that everyone is of strong mind, body and spirit". In November 2021, the band announced its reunion. The band opened their return at Cain's Ballroom in Oklahoma, the start of a series of sold out shows throughout 2022.

== Personal life ==
Felker is a keen hunter, crediting his Oklahoma upbringing to bringing him into the culture. He is friends with country singer-songwriter Corb Lund, and the two have hunted together.

Felker married accountant Staci Nelson in September 2016, in Barcelona, Spain. They split in February 2018 after his affair with Miranda Lambert became public; Nelson and Felker were divorced that August.

Before the Turnpike Troubadours went on hiatus, there were multiple reports of Felker appearing intoxicated during his performances, along with the band cancelling over a dozen shows. In an August 2020 interview with Rolling Stone, Felker said he had found sobriety and was working on a ranch in Texas. He reconciled with Nelson, who revealed on her Instagram page that they had remarried in June 2020. They welcomed their first child, Evangelina Hartford Felker, in January 2021 and their second child, Everett Augustus Felker, in September 2022.

== See also ==
- Turnpike Troubadours
