= List of West Virginia University alumni =

This list of West Virginia University alumni includes notable people from published sources that previously attended West Virginia University.

== Arts and entertainment ==
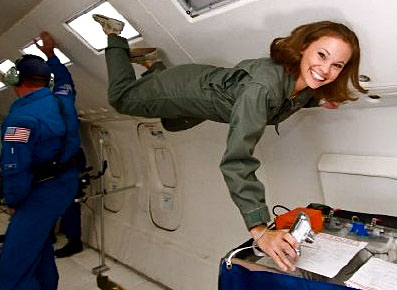
Emily Calandrelli, science communicator and aerospace engineer, on a reduced-gravity flight

Don Knotts, five-time Emmy Award-winning actor best known for his role as Barney Fife on The Andy Griffith Show

- Michael Ammar – world-renowned magician; WVU Distinguished Alumni Award winner 2003
- Miles Bell – talent manager for musicians and other performers
- Emily Calandrelli – science communicator, host and producer for Netflix's Emily's Wonder Lab and children's STEM science programming block Xploration Station
- Paul Dooley – actor, writer, comedian
- Conchata Ferrell – actress; known for playing Berta the housekeeper on the CBS sitcom Two and a Half Men
- Antoine Fuqua – director of Training Day, Shooter, Replacement Killers; attended, but did not graduate
- Steve Harvey – Emmy-winning host of Family Feud; attended, but did not graduate
- Cheryl Hines – actress, Curb Your Enthusiasm; attended but did not graduate
- Mike Hodge (B.A. in journalism, minor in theater) – actor and actors' labor union executive; former President of SAG-AFTRA New York local
- Taylor Kinney – actor; portrays Lt. Kelly Severide in NBC's drama Chicago Fire; stars in The Other Woman
- Don Knotts – television and movie actor
- Richard Kuranda – theatrical producer and artistic director Eugene O'Neill Theater Center, Signature Theatre Company, Raue Center for the Arts
- Blanche Lazzell – American Modernist painter, printmaker, and designer
- Billy Mays – television advertiser featured on Discovery Channel's PitchMen and known for promoting several as seen on TV products; attended but did not graduate; died in 2009
- Trevor Dion Nicholas – Broadway star (known for Aladdin)
- Kathleen Noone – portrays Edna Wallace on the NBC soap opera Passions; known to have attended
- Ben Reed – actor; played quarterback for the West Virginia University football team
- John A. Russo – screenwriter and film director; co-wrote Night of the Living Dead
- Chris Sarandon – television and movie actor, voice of Jack Skellington
- David Selby – actor
- Jeremy Sheffey – former professional football player; former arena football player
- Robert Ellis Silberstein – manager of Diana Ross, Billy Preston, Meat Loaf
- Curt Wootton – star of YouTube series Pittsburgh Dad

== Athletics ==
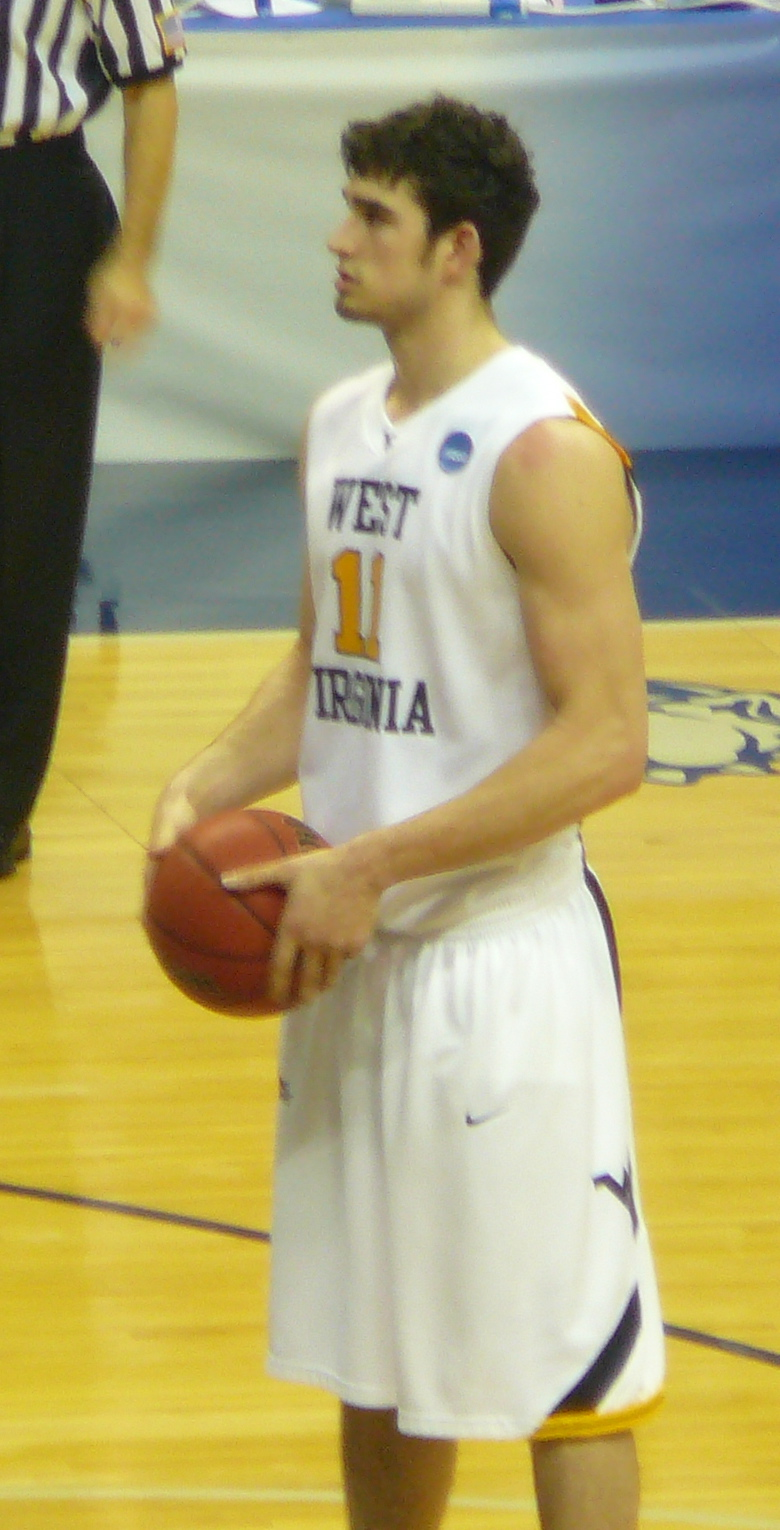
Joe Alexander

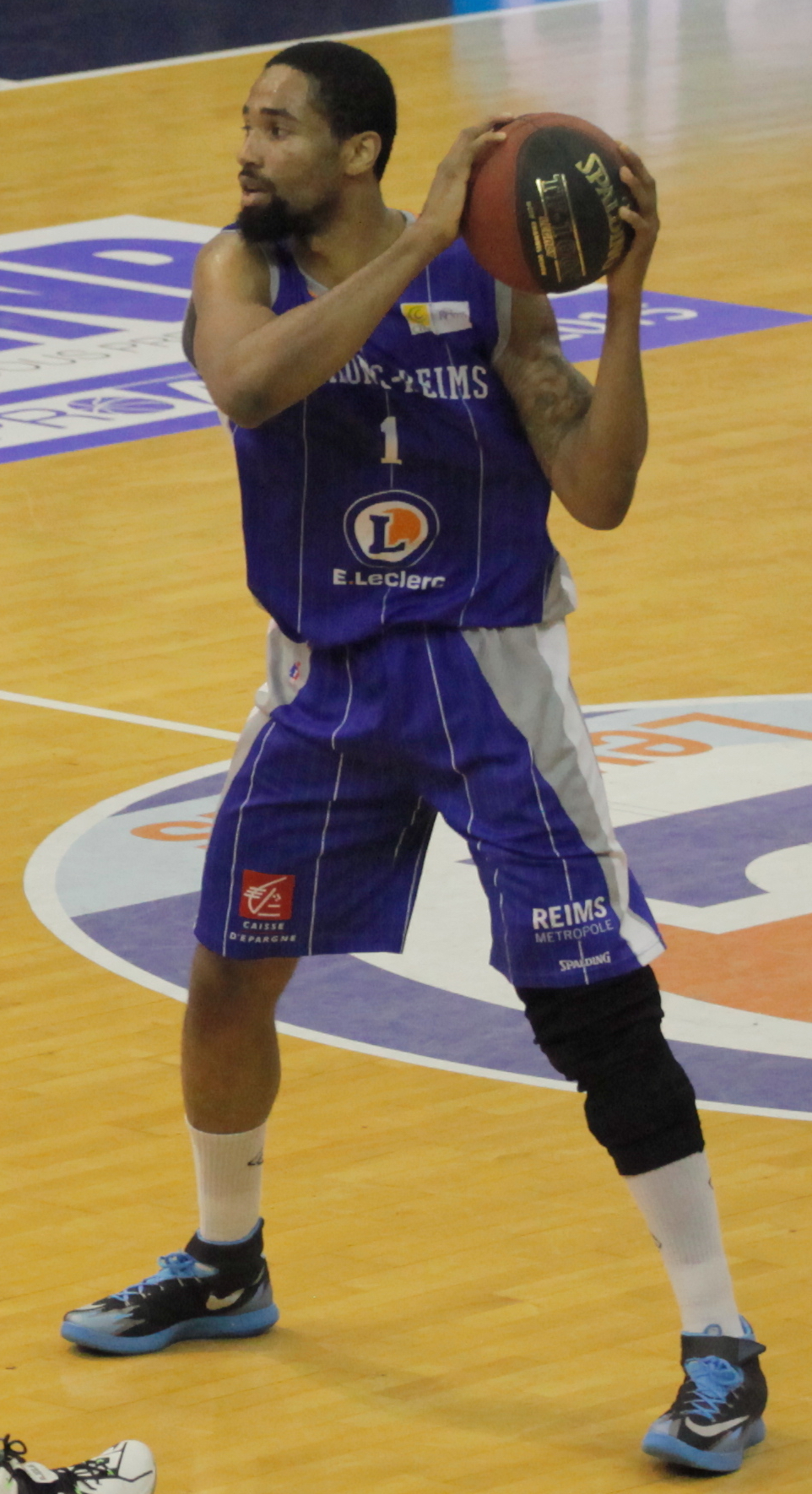
Da'Sean Butler

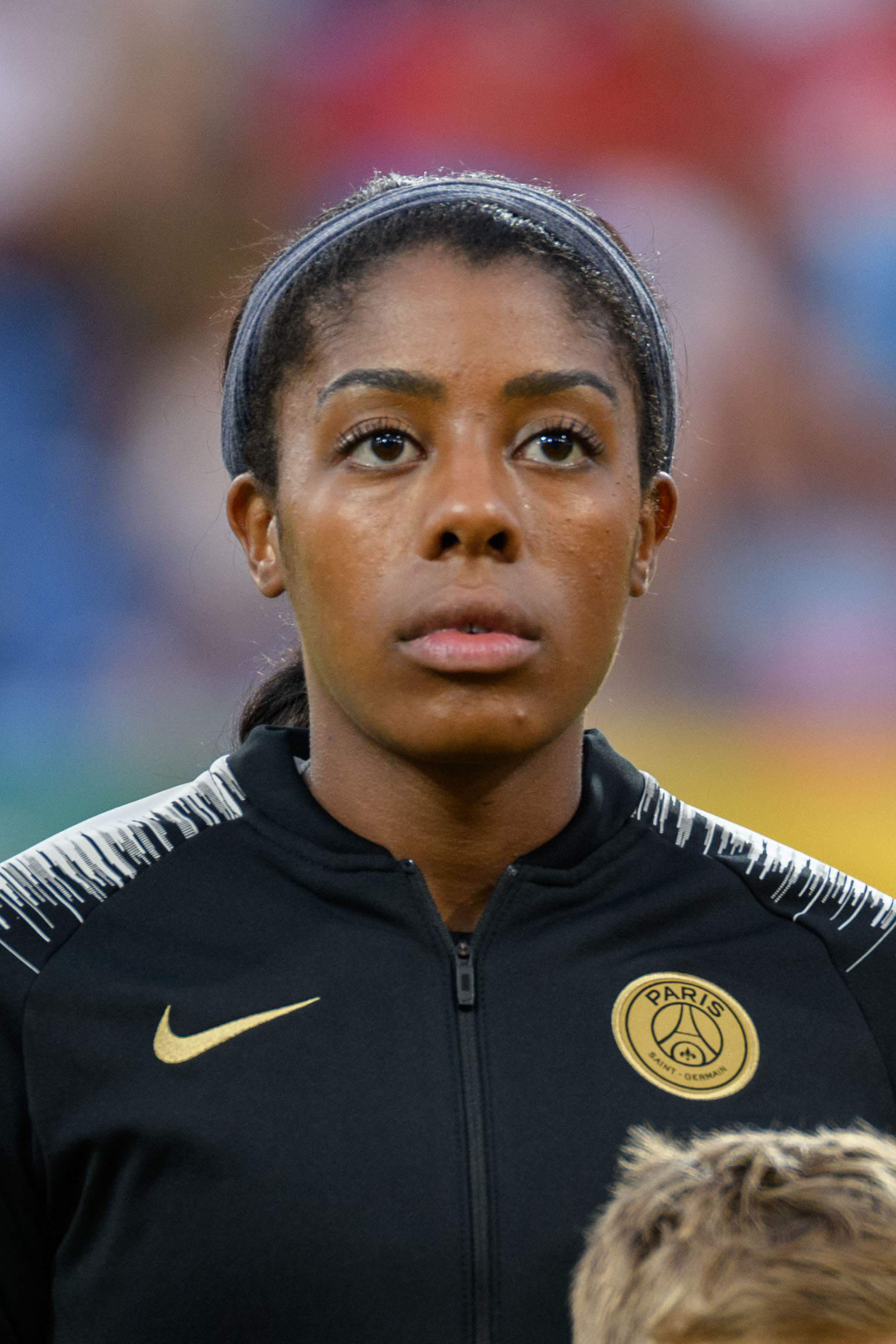
Ashley Lawrence

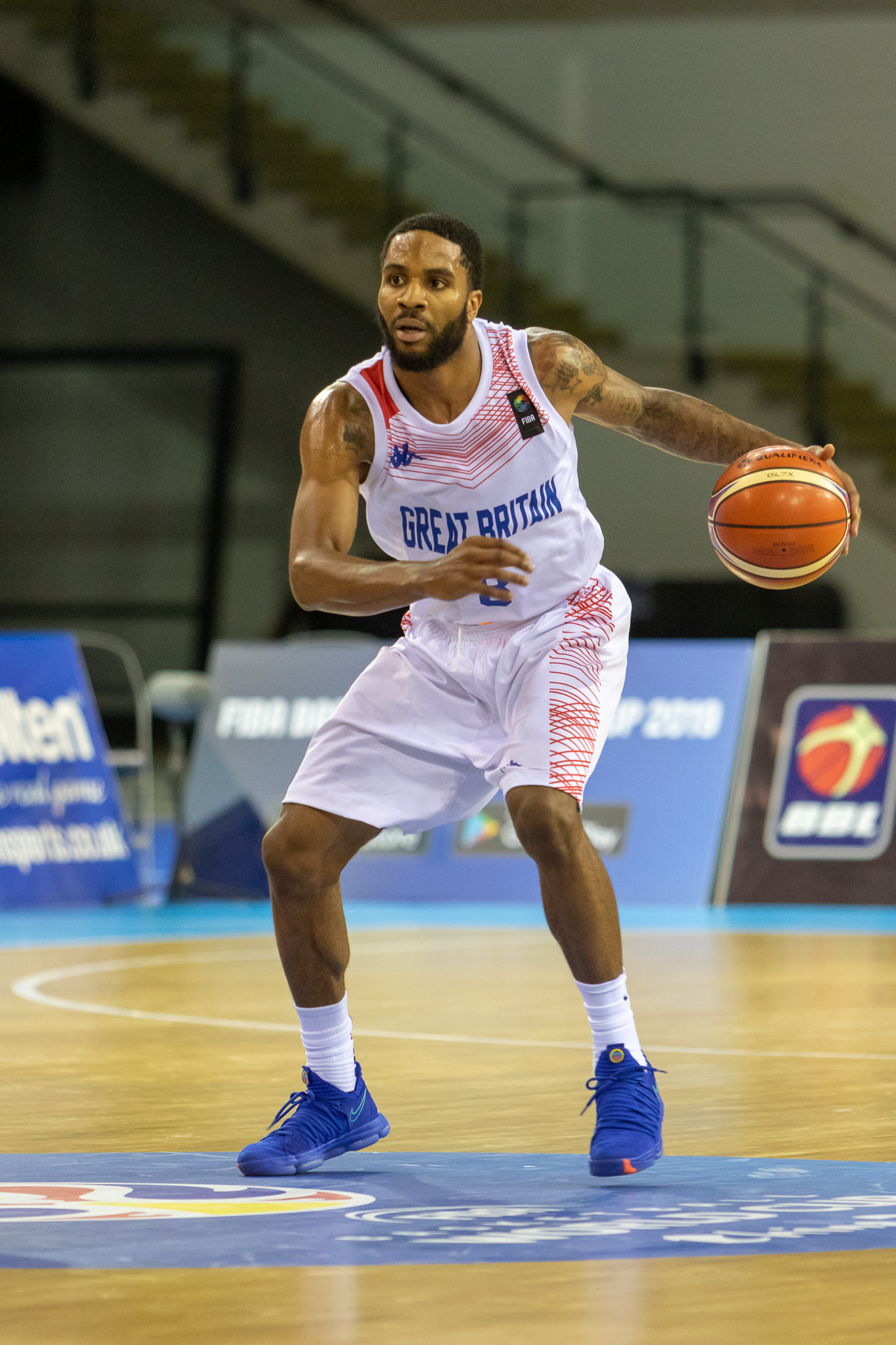
Tarik Phillip

- Joe Alexander – American-Israeli current professional basketball player for Maccabi Tel Aviv
- Michael Baker – football player
- Terry Bowden – Yahoo sports analyst
- Tommy Bowden – former head football coach for Clemson University and Tulane University
- Wesley Brooks – basketbal coach, head coach of the Utah State Aggies women's basketball team
- John Browning – former NFL defensive tackle for the Kansas City Chiefs
- Marc Bulger – former NFL quarterback for the St. Louis Rams, New Orleans Saints, and Baltimore Ravens
- Da'Sean Butler (born 1987) – basketball player for Hapoel Be'er Sheva of the Israeli Premier League
- Niccolò Campriani – Olympic gold- and silver medal-winning sport shooter; won gold in the men's 50 metre rifle three positions and silver in the men's 10 metre air rifle at the 2012 Summer Olympics
- Jevon Carter – current NBA player for the Orlando Magic
- Curt Cignetti - current head football coach for Indiana University
- Mike Compton – two-time Super Bowl Champion and former NFL guard for the Detroit Lions, New England Patriots, and Jacksonville Jaguars
- Devin Ebanks – professional basketball player
- James "Clayster" Eubanks – professional Call of Duty player, two-time Call of Duty Championship winner
- D'or Fischer (born 1981) – American-Israeli basketball player in the Israeli National League
- Mike Gansey – former basketball player in the NBA Development League; current general manager of the Cleveland Cavaliers
- Albert Gwynne, former United States national basketball team and West Virginia Mountaineers athletic trainer
- Jedd Gyorko – former second baseman for the St. Louis Cardinals
- Major Harris – quarterback for West Virginia University in their 1988 undefeated season
- Roy Hawley, former athletic director for Marshall University and West Virginia University, namesake of Hawley Field
- Sue Haywood – professional mountain bike racer
- Chris Henry – former NFL wide receiver for the Cincinnati Bengals
- Johannes "Joe" Herber – former professional and German international basketball player
- Jeff Hostetler – Super Bowl Champion and former NFL quarterback for the Washington Redskins, Oakland Raiders, and New York Giants; starting quarterback in Super Bowl XXV
- Chuck Howley – former NFL linebacker for the Chicago Bears and Dallas Cowboys, and Super Bowl V MVP
- Sam Huff – former NFL linebacker; inducted into the Pro Football Hall of Fame in 1982
- Bob Huggins – former head coach of the West Virginia University men's basketball team and former West Virginia University basketball player
- Rodney Clark "Hot Rod" Hundley – former NBA basketball player for the Minneapolis/Los Angeles Lakers; first pick in the 1957 NBA draft
- Hal Hunter – football coach
- Bruce Irvin – Super Bowl Champion and former NFL linebacker for the Seattle Seahawks
- James Jett – Olympic gold medal-winning sprinter and former NFL wide receiver for Los Angeles/Oakland Raiders
- Adam "Pacman" Jones – NFL cornerback, currently a free agent
- Greg Jones – three-time NCAA Division 1 wrestling champion, 2005 Most Outstanding Wrestler award winner, former associate head coach for the West Virginia University wrestling team, current Blackzilians wrestling coach
- Brian Jozwiak – former NFL offensive lineman for the Kansas City Chiefs
- Ken Kendrick – owner of the Arizona Diamondbacks of Major League Baseball
- Steve Kline – former Major League Baseball pitcher
- Griffin Lake, sports shooter for the United states national rifle team
- Eugene Lamone, former NFL player, West Virginia Sports Hall of Fame
- Ellis Lankster – current NFL cornerback for the New York Jets
- Ashley Lawrence – soccer player for the Canada national team
- Oliver Luck – former NFL quarterback, athletic director of West Virginia University, first commissioner of the XFL, president/general manager of the Houston Dynamo, father of Andrew Luck
- Billy Joe Mantooth – former NFL linebacker for the Houston Oilers
- Joe Mazzulla – head coach for the Boston Celtics
- Pat McAfee – former NFL punter for the Indianapolis Colts
- Casey Mitchell (born 1988) – basketball player for Elitzur Ashkelon of the Israeli Basketball Premier League
- Dan Mozes – 2006 Rimington Trophy winner
- Adrian Murrell – former running back for New York Jets
- Solomon Page – former NFL offensive lineman for the Dallas Cowboys and San Diego Chargers
- Lee Patton – legendary basketball coach, WVU Sports Hall of Fame
- Tarik Phillip (born 1993) – British-American basketball player in the Israel Basketball Premier League
- Kevin Pittsnogle – former basketball player in the NBA Development League
- Adrian Pledger (born 1976) – basketball player
- Jerry Porter – former NFL wide receiver for the Oakland Raiders and Jacksonville Jaguars
- Wil Robinson – former ABA basketball player; All-American at West Virginia
- Rich Rodriguez – former head football coach of the University of Michigan; current head football coach of the University of Arizona
- Todd Sauerbrun – former All-Pro NFL punter (five different teams)
- Owen Schmitt – former NFL fullback for the Seattle Seahawks, Philadelphia Eagles, and Oakland Raiders
- Floyd B. "Ben" Schwartzwalder – former head coach of the 1959 National Championship Syracuse University football team
- Heath Slater – professional wrestler, former wrestler at WVU
- Steve Slaton – former NFL running back for the Houston Texans and Miami Dolphins; current CFL running back for the Toronto Argonauts
- Geno Smith – current NFL quarterback for the New York Jets
- Dave Stephenson – former NFL guard for the Los Angeles Rams and Green Bay Packers
- Darryl Talley – West Virginia University all-time team member and former NFL linebacker for the Buffalo Bills
- Rod Thorn – former NBA and ABA basketball player and current president of Basketball Operation for the NBA
- John Thornton – former NFL defensive tackle for the Cincinnati Bengals
- Virginia Thrasher – current WVU rifle team member and 2016 Olympic gold medalist in air rifle
- Yutaro Tsukada – professional soccer player
- Mike Vanderjagt – former NFL placekicker for the Indianapolis Colts and Dallas Cowboys
- Jerry West – former NBA basketball player for the Los Angeles Lakers and Hall of Famer; considered one of the greatest NBA and college basketball players of all time; is the image on the logo for the NBA
- JJ Wetherholt – 7th pick in 2024 MLB draft
- Pat White – former NFL quarterback for the Miami Dolphins
- Andrew Wright – current defender/midfielder for Morecambe F.C.
- John Writer – Olympic gold and silver medal-winning sports shooter
- Amos Zereoué – former NFL running back for the Pittsburgh Steelers, Oakland Raiders, and New England Patriots

== Authors ==
- Maggie Anderson – poet
- Allen Appel – writer
- Matt Carson – novelist
- Stephen Coonts – New York Times bestselling author
- Paul Russell Cutright – historian and biologist
- Chip Ingram – Christian writer
- Chuck Kinder – novelist
- Ann Pancake – author
- Jayne Anne Phillips – Pulitzer Prize-winning author
- Bill Yearout - (Author) Coach Lee Patton, the Untold Legend (legendary WVU basketball coach)

== Business ==
- Heather Bresch – CEO of Mylan, Inc.
- John Chambers – president and CEO of Cisco Systems
- Karen S. Evans – de facto CIO of the United States under President George W. Bush
- Ken Kendrick – owner of Arizona Diamondbacks of MLB; billionaire
- Maggie Hardy Magerko – president of 84 Lumber Company and Nemacolin Woodlands Resort (attended for two years but did not graduate)

== Education ==
- Charles E. Bayless – president of the West Virginia University Institute of Technology
- Todd H. Bullard – former president of Potomac State College and Bethany College
- Margaret Buchanan Cole – mathematician, retired professor emeritus from WVU
- David Daniel – psychologist
- Joseph DiSarro (Ph.D.) – professor and chair in the Department of Political Science at Washington & Jefferson College
- Wanda Franz (Ph.D.) – professor and anti-abortion activist
- Mary McClung – professor of theatrical costume design and puppetry at West Virginia University
- Ruqayyah Ahmed Rufa'i – Nigeria's minister of education
- Steven E. Shreve – university professor emeritus at Carnegie Mellon University
- Patrick Vaughan – historian and professor at the Jagiellonian University in Kraków, Poland
- Charles M. Vest – president emeritus of Massachusetts Institute of Technology (MIT)

== Journalists ==
- Frank Kearns (died 1986) – foreign correspondent and broadcast journalist with CBS News 1953–1971; WVU professor of Journalism 1971–1983
- Frank Lovece
- Asra Nomani
- Michael Tomasky – editor in chief of Democracy, editor of The New Republic
- Ken Ward Jr. – reporter for the Charleston Gazette-Mail; 2018 MacArthur Fellow

== Military ==
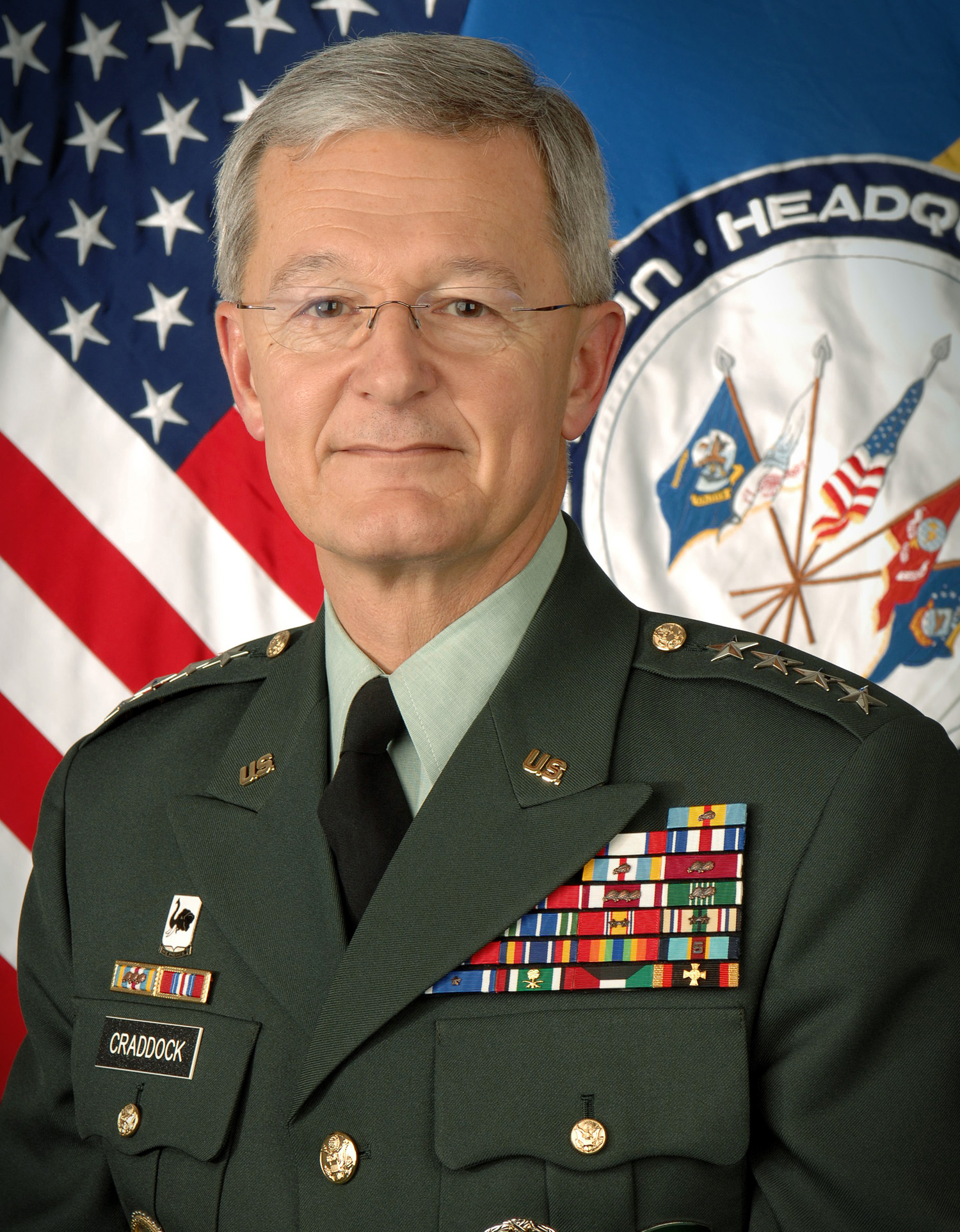
Bantz J. Craddock, former US European Command (USEUCOM), NATO's Supreme Allied Commander Europe (SACEUR), and commanding officer of Allied Command Operations (ACO)

- Ret. Gen. Earl E. Anderson – Marine Corps general
- Corporal Thomas W. Bennett – US Army conscientious objector corporal who served as a combat medic
- Ret. Gen. Bantz J. Craddock – United States Army, former Supreme Allied Commander Europe
- Brig. Gen. Frank Kendall Everest, Jr – test pilot and pioneer of rocket aircraft
- Gen. Robert H. Foglesong – retired commander, US Air Force in Europe; former president of Mississippi State University
- MG George T. Garrett – US Army major general

== Music ==
- Velvet Brown – tuba soloist, music educator
- Jay Chattaway – Star Trek music score writer and film composer
- Little Jimmy Dickens – country music singer
- Nancy Galbraith – internationally acclaimed composer
- Charles Wesley Godwin – new-age folk/country singer/songwriter
- Fuzzy Knight – writer of the WVU Fight Song and country-western actor
- Scott Krippayne – singer/songwriter
- Kathy Mattea – country music singer
- James Valenti – tenor at the Metropolitan Opera, New York

== Politics ==
- Victor A. Arredondo – former minister of education at the State of Veracruz, Mexico, 2004–2010
- Carl George Bachmann – United States congressman, Republican minority whip 1931–1933
- Clark S. Barnes – West Virginia Senate, District 15, 2004–present
- William Wallace Barron – 26th governor of West Virginia
- Irene Berger – United States district judge for the Southern District of West Virginia
- Frank L. Bowman – politician who represented West Virginia in the United States House of Representatives
- Eric Brooks – West Virginia House of Delegates
- Virginia Mae Brown – first woman to head the Interstate Commerce Commission
- Becky Cain – past president of the League of Women Voters
- Fred H. Caplan – former justice of the Supreme Court of Appeals of West Virginia
- Geno Chiarelli – West Virginia state delegate
- William G. Conley – 18th governor of West Virginia
- William Harrison Courtney – special assistant to President Clinton
- Joseph M. Devine – governor of North Dakota 1898–1899
- Karen S. Evans – CISA advisor and author
- David Ginsburg (1912–2010) – presidential adviser and executive director of the Kerner Commission
- William E. Glasscock – 13th governor of West Virginia
- Howard Mason Gore – 17th governor of West Virginia
- Kathleen M. Hawk – director of the Federal Bureau of Prisons
- Robert Lynn Hogg – represented West Virginia in the United States House of Representatives, 1930–1933
- Brad Hoylman – current Manhattan Borough President and former New York state senator representing the 27th District, which includes Midtown, Times Square, and Greenwich Village of lower Manhattan
- Nancy Jacobs – Maryland state senator (1973)
- Ray Keener – member of the West Virginia House of Delegates
- Sen. Harley M. Kilgore – chairman of the US Senate Subcommittee on War Mobilization during World War II
- Tim Mahoney – United States congressman from Florida
- Joe Manchin – 34th governor of West Virginia; United States senator from West Virginia
- William C. Marland – 24th governor of West Virginia
- Edward F. McClain – member of the Wisconsin State Assembly
- Darrell McGraw – former West Virginia attorney general, former chief justice of the West Virginia Supreme Court
- Andy McKenzie – former West Virginia senator and mayor of Wheeling, West Virginia
- Carlos Eduardo Mendoza – United States district judge for the Middle District of Florida
- M. Blane Michael – circuit judge, United States Court of Appeals for the Fourth Circuit
- Alan Mollohan – United States congressman
- Arch A. Moore, Jr. – 28th and 30th governor of West Virginia
- Ephraim F. Morgan – 16th governor of West Virginia
- Matthew M. Neely – 22nd governor of West Virginia
- Asra Nomani – former Wall Street Journal reporter, author and Islamic reform and feminism activist
- Corey Lee Palumbo – West Virginia Senate, District 17, 2009–present and West Virginia House of Representatives 2003–2009
- Mike Pantelides – mayor of Annapolis, Maryland
- Tom Pridemore – West Virginia House of Delegates and football player
- Jeff Pyle – Pennsylvania state representative
- Stuart F. Reed – politician who represented West Virginia in the United States House of Representatives
- Clay Riley – West Virginia state delegate
- Nelson Stamler – New Jersey state senator, assemblyman, judge, and prosecutor
- Virginia Starcher – member of the West Virginia House of Delegates, 1986–1990
- Paul S. Stull – member of the Maryland House of Delegates
- William S. Thompson – United States attorney for the Southern District of West Virginia
- John G. Trueschler – former member of the Maryland House of Delegates (1979)
- Cecil H. Underwood – youngest (25th) and oldest (32nd) governor of West Virginia
- Christopher C. Wilkes – judge, West Virginia Circuit Court

== Royalty ==
- Princess Sarah Culberson – Mende princess and philanthropist

== Science and technology ==
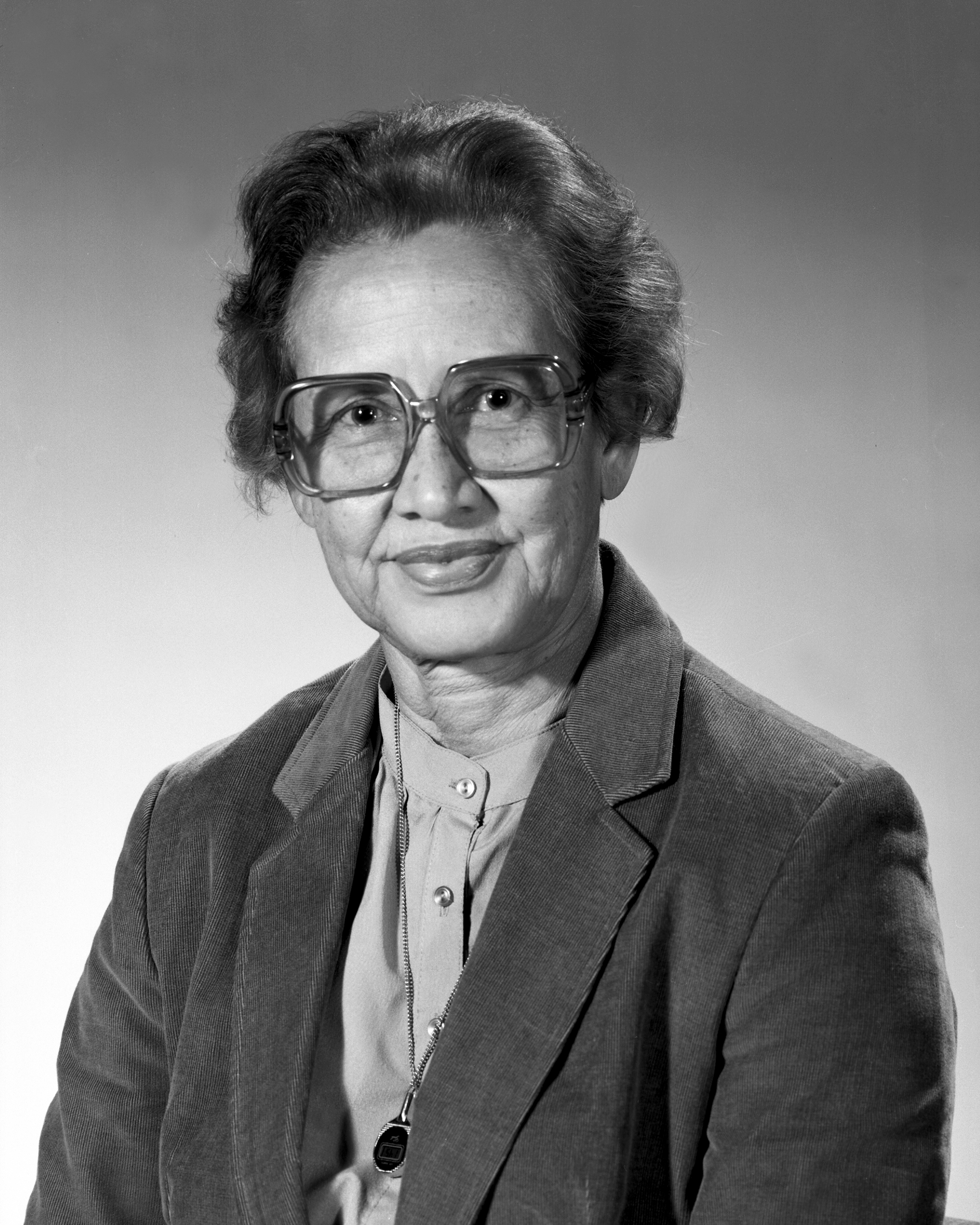
Katherine Johnson, a "human computer" whose calculations for NASA were critical to the first successful U.S. crewed spaceflight

- Ann Bartuska – ecologist and biologist, senior advisor at Resources for the Future and former deputy under secretary for Research, Education and Economics at United States Department of Agriculture
- James M. Bobbitt – chemist and professor at the University of Connecticut
- Emily Calandrelli – science communicator; host of science programs and author of science books for children
- Dianne Dorland – engineer and first female president of the American Institute of Chemical Engineers
- Frances Harshbarger (1902–1987) – mathematician
- Steven C. Hayes – psychologist
- Katherine Johnson – mathematician, NASA computer scientist, recipient of the Presidential Medal of Freedom
- Robert Kerns – psychologist
- Jon McBride – NASA astronaut
- Bill Neal – pediatric cardiologist
- Kim Weaver – astrophysicist

== Other ==
- Cynthia Germanotta – philanthropist, co-founder of Born This Way; Lady Gaga's mother
- Patsy Ramsey – mother of JonBenet Ramsey; Miss West Virginia 1977

== See also ==
- List of people from Morgantown, West Virginia
- List of presidents of West Virginia University
