= List of people from Morgantown, West Virginia =

This is a list of people who were born in, lived in, or are closely associated with the city of Morgantown, West Virginia.

== Athletics ==
- Jeff Bowden, NCAA football coach
- Terry Bowden, NCAA football coach
- Tommy Bowden, NCAA football coach
- Rich Braham, professional football player
- Necro Butcher, professional wrestler
- Lowell Cowell, NASCAR Cup Series driver
- Albert Gwynne, former United States national basketball team and West Virginia Mountaineers athletic trainer
- Jedd Gyorko, baseball player
- Alan Henderson, professional basketball player
- Charlie Hickman, baseball player, made Morgantown his home
- Bob Huggins, West Virginia University head basketball coach
- Dwayne Jones, professional basketball player
- Josh Judy, professional baseball player
- Paul Mainieri, LSU baseball coach
- Lee Patton, WVU basketball coach
- Xavier Proctor, football player
- Dale Ramsburg, NCAA baseball coach
- Zach Spiker, college basketball coach
- Michael Wardian, marathoner and ultra-marathoner
- Kim Weaver, astrophysicist

== Arts and entertainment ==
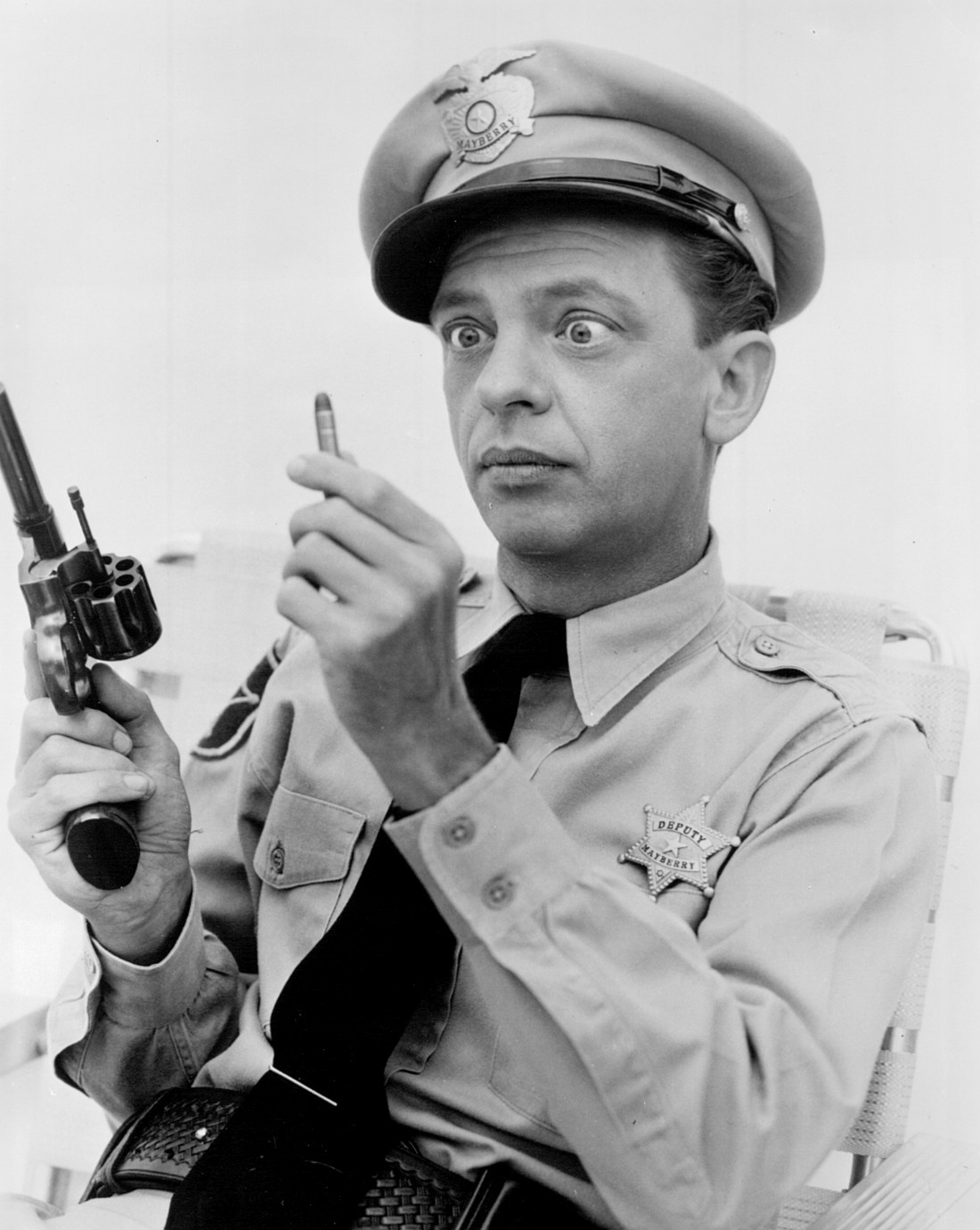
Don Knotts

- Emily Calandrelli, TV host, actor, author, and engineer
- Jack Fleming, sports announcer
- Charles Wesley Godwin, musician
- Linda Goodman, astrologer and poet
- Eriko Hattori, painter
- Alicia Holloway, ballerina and television personality
- Lawrence Kasdan, screenwriter/director
- Don Knotts, actor (city unveiled statue in 2016)
- Hoda Kotb, broadcast journalist
- Blanche Lazzell, modern artist, printmaker, and painter
- Frank Lovece, journalist and author
- Ellie Mannette, father of the modern steel drum, musician
- William Matheny, singer-songwriter
- Herbert Morrison, journalist
- Asra Nomani, journalist, political activist
- Freddy Quinn, German film star and singer
- David Selby, actor
- Kimberley Starr, novelist
- Michael Tomasky, journalist and author
- Franklin White, British ballet dancer
- Allison Williams, Miss West Virginia (2003)

== Education ==
- Earl Lemley Core, botanist and local historian
- John Douglas, conductor and educator
- Walter Hough, curator of United States National Museum
- John Laidley, a founder of Marshall University
- Duncan Lorimer, astrophysicist noted for discovering the first fast radio burst
- Alexander Wade, educational reformer
- Israel C. White, geologist and professor

== Politics ==
- John O. Bennett, New Jersey state senator
- Marion Cannon, U.S. representative from California
- Edgar F. Heiskell III, West Virginia secretary of state and lawyer
- Moses Kinkaid, congressman, sponsor of Kinkaid Land Act
- Riley Moore, U.S. representative for West Virginia
- Francis Harrison Pierpont, 19th-century governor
- Waitman T. Willey, U.S. senator

== Other ==
- Earl E. Anderson, ret. general, youngest active-duty Marine to become general
- Thomas Bennett, U.S. Army medic and conscientious objector, awarded Medal of Honor
- William Easterly, economist
- Shelia Eddy, convicted of murdering Skylar Neese
- Robert C. Frasure, first U.S. ambassador to Estonia following its independence from Soviet Union
- Robert P. George, founder of American Principles Project
- Elliott Portnoy, attorney
- Gene Arden Vance Jr., Special Operations soldier with the West Virginia National Guard; killed in action in Afghanistan in 2002
- Dorothy Vaughan, mathematician

== See also ==
- List of West Virginia University alumni
- List of presidents of West Virginia University
