= Gene Vance Jr. Day =

Gene Vance Jr. Day is the only commemorative Military Appreciation Day named for a fallen US soldier, Gene Arden Vance Jr. Founded in 2012 by Vance's close friend and brother in-law, Michael M.J. Minc, it is recognized annually during May in the United States of America with remembrances at select military and civilian installations that bear Vance's name in State of West Virginia, California, Texas and Afghanistan.

Occurring during Military Appreciation Month and US Armed Forces Week, it honors the legacy of American soldiers who returned home from the War in Afghanistan (2001-2021) and the Iraq War (2003–11), together the longest wars in US history, remembers and mourns the fallen and supports the wounded. Official observances are proclaimed annually on May 18 in the City of Morgantown, West Virginia in a citywide ceremony that includes official proclamations, state and local governmental and military leadership addresses and greetings, wreath laying memorializing the names of fallen soldiers from West Virginia, guest speakers and participation from national organizations, musical performances and events to raise awareness for those wounded in the conflict. The day is organized annually by the Gene Vance Jr. Foundation, the West Virginia Army National Guard, City of Morgantown and State of West Virginia.

Framing the Gene Vance Jr. Day are two other US military appreciation days that occur nationally in May, Armed Forces Day, which honors those currently serving followed by Memorial Day, a public holiday honoring and mourning the military personnel who have died while serving in the United States Armed Forces. The Gene Vance Jr. Day is distinct from other US military appreciation days in that it is named for an American military hero and specifically honors American service members and their allies who served and were wounded after the September 11 terrorist attacks as well as those who perished in the conflict.

== COVID-19 pandemic ==
On May 16, 2020 amidst the COVID-19 pandemic, founder of the day Michael M.J. Minc spearheaded the 9th annual Gene Vance Jr. Day by creating a virtual event on US Armed Forces Day that also recognized everyone involved in the fight against COVID-19. Entitled ‘United in Spirit’ it brought together national government leaders like Senators Joseph Manchin III, Shelley Moore Capito, WV Governor Jim Justice, Morgantown Mayor Bill Kawecki, military leaders like Adjutant General of the West Virginia Army National Guard, Major General James A. Hoyer, education leaders E. Gordon Gee of West Virginia University and President Mirta Martin of Fairmont State University as well as those on the frontlines of the pandemic.

The goal of the virtual ceremony was to inspire hope and unite people during a time of global social and economic disruption on a day which historically honors those on the front lines of the Global War on Terror. It included President David S. Goldberg, C.E.O of Mon Health System, the parent company of Mon Health Medical Center, prayer from Christian and Jewish religious leaders along with local musical performers like Davisson Brothers Band, American Idol contestant and country musician Cody Clayton Eagle, Morgantown Vox Principalis Choral Association, singer songwriters Eric Lewis and Rick Martin.

== Presidential and congressional commendation ==
On May 15, 2021 Vance's brother-in-law and founder of the day Michael M.J. Minc, spearheaded a virtual tribute on US Armed Forces Day to celebrate the 10th Anniversary of the Gene Vance Jr. Day and commemorate the 20th Anniversary year of the September 11 attacks. It also honored the memory of COVID-19 pandemic victims and encouraged COVID-19 vaccination in the United States in support of ongoing mass immunization efforts.

Entitled ‘United in Spirit 2021, American Tribute 10’, it received a letter of commendation from the 46th president of the United States, Joe Biden who was also commander-in-chief of the US Armed Forces, praising the Gene Vance Jr. Foundation's efforts aimed at improving the quality of life for wounded veterans.

The 10th Gene Vance Jr. Day brought together prominent US government and military leaders with commendation messages from Senators Joseph Manchin III, Shelley Moore Capito and West Virginia Governor Jim Justice. General Austin S. Miller, former commander of US Army and NATO forces in Afghanistan, State Adjutant General of the West Virginia National Guard, Brigadier General William Crane, Colonel Gary M Hausman, former Commandant of the Defense Language Institute Foreign Language Center and Command Sergeant Major Dennis Riggs of Vance's unit the 19th Special Forces Group (Airborne) also participated.

Prayer from Christian and Jewish military chaplains from the Army and U.S. Marine Corps, a virtual wreath laying by Daughters of the American Revolution (DAR) Woodburn Chapter Regent, Cynthia Harper along with messages from education leader President E. Gordon Gee and the 45th President General of DAR, Denise Doring VanBuren were included in the memorial ceremony.

State leaders on the frontlines of the COVID-19 pandemic included West Virginia Coronavirus “czar”, Dr.Clay Marsh and retired Adjutant General of the West Virginia National Guard Joint Forces, Major General James A. Hoyer, Director of the WV Covid-19 Joint Interagency Task Force (JIATF) encouraged vaccination as well as unity during a time of social disruption. Local leaders included the 150th Mayor of Morgantown, WV Ron Delaney Jr. as well as Patriot Guard Riders WV Ride Captain Douglas D. Geary.

The goals of the virtual ceremony, created amidst the ongoing coronavirus pandemic, gave people who may not have been able to attend in person the ability to participate. This included musical performers nationwide like Dr.Letícia Grützmann leading the Carroll University Choirs in Waukesha, Wisconsin, David Winans II of the Winans family leading his band PI in Detroit, Michigan as well as California-based actor, composer, singer, songwriter Abri van Straten husband of Kristin Bauer van Straten and Oregon-based blues artist Ben Rice. Musical performers from West Virginia included Chief Warrant Officer Jeremiah Bennett leading the 249th United States Army Band, Chris and Donnie Davisson of the Davisson Brothers Band, American Idol contestant and country musician Cody Clayton Eagle and singer songwriters Eric Lewis and Rick Martin who debuted their musical response to the pandemic during the broadcast.

== Decade of growth and expansion ==
The Gene Vance Jr. Day has grown and expanded since its inception ten years ago. Founder Michael M. J. Minc's (pronounced “Mintz”) efforts collectively as Vance's brother-in-law, close friend and leader of the Gene Vance Jr. Foundation, Bud's Bold Brew and the Gene Vance Jr. Day together with the US military, local and federal organizations have kept Vance's memory alive. The day, together with buildings, a military installation, a bridge, roads and a trail in locations all over the world, are dedicated in Vance's honor.

The inaugural commemorative Gene Vance Jr. Day in 2012 was a small ceremony in Vance's hometown, the City of Morgantown WV, that included celebrating Vance's life as an American hero, distinguished member of the local community and WVNG during the US military appreciation month of May, the month in which Vance was killed in action. Over the past 10 years, Minc spearheaded the day to include dignitaries, prominent leaders, military personnel, guests, active events, live musical performances, tributes to military, first responders and others.

The COVID-19 pandemic caused the 2020, 2021 and 2022 editions of the ceremony to become virtual, further expanding the day, participation and attendance.

== 2022 Russian invasion of Ukraine ==
On May 21, 2022, US Armed Forces Day, amidst the 2022 Russian invasion of Ukraine, Vance's brother-in-law and founder Michael M.J. Minc created and broadcast a third virtual tribute event to celebrate the 11th Anniversary of the Gene Vance Jr. Day and commemorate the 20th anniversary of Vance's death during the 21st Anniversary year of 9/11.

Entitled ‘American Freedom Tribute XI' it included messages of support for the people and soldiers of Ukraine from prominent US state and national leaders. A variety of messages from annual participants were broadcast including honoring the role of the West Virginia National Guard and WVU during the COVID-19 pandemic. A special greeting letter of commendation from the Governor of West Virginia, Jim Justice thanked Minc and the foundation he founded in Vance's name for their role.

The virtual event featured a variety of music from several performers who participate annually including the 249th United States Army Band and the Davisson Brothers from West Virginia. Musicians from various states again paid tribute with messages in honor of the day including California-based actor, composer, singer, songwriter Abri van Straten and Oregon-based blues artist Ben Rice.

== 2023 Last American Flag ==
On May 20, 2023, US Armed Forces Day, Vance's brother-in-law Michael M.J. Minc, founder of the Day and leader of the Gene Vance Jr. Foundation for the Catastrophically Injured, created an historic tribute event in Vance's adopted hometown of Morgantown, West Virginia. The event commemorated the 12th annual Gene Vance Jr. Day.

Entitled “The Last American Flag”, the City of Morgantown together with Vance's 2/19 Special Forces (Airborne) unit, raised for the first time on American soil, the last American flag flown for 20 years at the US.Special Forces Headquarters, Camp Vance, Afghanistan.

In December 2002, the United States Department of Defense established Camp Vance, Afghanistan (named for Gene Arden Vance Jr) to headquarter the Combined Joint Special Operations Task Force (CJSOTF).

Camp-Vance was headquartered by U.S. Special Forces troops whose core tasks included advising the Afghan National Army special operations forces and local police, training forces associated with the Village Stability Operations (VSO) and counterinsurgency (COIN). The camp also housed highly specialized battalion-level task forces built around Army Special Forces, infantry, a US Marine special operations battalion, and a Navy SEAL team.

On September 11, 2022, the 21st Anniversary of 9/11 and the 20th anniversary year of SSG Vance's death, the last American flag to fly over Camp Vance was presented to Jamie L. Vance-Minc and Michael M.J. Minc, Vance's sister and brother-in-law, by the US 10th Special Forces Group, Airborne. The American flag that flew in honor of Vance at the military base that carried his name for two decades traveled over 8,000 miles from Bagram to Fort Carson and was presented to Vance's family by Lieutenant Colonel Matt Chaney, who was the former commander of the 3rd Battalion, 10th Special Forces Group (Airborne) in Afghanistan the year Camp Vance was closed.

On May 20, 2023 Founder Michael M.J. Minc featured the flag raising to symbolize the end of the War in Afghanistan (2001–2021), the longest war in American history and the legacy of Vance's bravery that saved the lives of two fellow American soldiers and 18 Afghan soldiers despite being critically wounded during the early days of the war.

Families, fellow veterans, military and civilian leaders attended the flag raising which was part of the official observance and memorial ceremony recognizing the sacrifices that were made for the nation by all servicemen and women during the 20-year war. Minc, in a radio interview with WAJR 'Talk of the Town' thanked everyone for their service saying that ‘never forget’ should not just be a catchphrase for fellow US military families’ sacrifices in safeguarding the nation. Minc reminded the audience of the distinct uniqueness of the Gene Vance Jr. Day and its embodiment of The State of West Virginia's role in safeguarding the United States of America.

US Senator James Conley Justice II, past Governor and Commander-in-Chief of the state of West Virginia's military forces issued an official press statement about not forgetting Vance's impact on his fellow servicemen and women as well as the state. The governor said this act of appreciation solidifies Vance's lasting legacy and honors his unwavering dedication, selflessness and remarkable bravery. An official proclamation published by the Governor honored The Gene Vance Jr. Foundation in recognition of the unique distinction of the historic day.

Major General William ("Bill") E. Crane, the Adjutant General for the State of West Virginia Joint Forces Headquarters issued an official video from the West Virginia National Guard asking everyone to remember and honor SSG Gene "Buddy" Vance Jr., and the service and sacrifice of his family. “As we come together today to remember Gene Vance and all the sacrifices that he and his family made for this country, I want us to always remember to try and live our lives the way that Gene did. It is absolutely a tremendous thing that our soldiers and our airmen do for our state and our nation." Crane said.

Lieutenant Colonel Bob Luther, Commander of Vance's Special Forces unit, 2nd Battalion, 19th Special Forces Group (Airborne), West Virginia National Guard introduced the historic flag ceremony. “This is Gene Vance Day here in Morgantown and it's important to keep his memory alive. He sacrificed the ultimate sacrifice 21 years ago and it's important to remember that and honor that and just keep his memory alive,” Lieutenant Colonel Luther said.

On May 15, 2021, the last Flag Retreat Ceremony ever to be observed at Camp Vance, Afghanistan was held just prior to dusk. Retreat ceremonies typically mark the end of duty for the day.

On June 22, 2021 the flag departed from Afghanistan and arrived in the US on June 24, 2021. On September 11, 2022 the flag was presented to Vance's sister and brother-in-law.

On May 20, 2023, US Armed Forces Day, the flag was raised for the first time on American soil at the Public Safety Building on Spruce Street in downtown Morgantown Historic District. Mayor Jennifer Selin of Morgantown issued an official proclamation and address which marked the 21st anniversary year of SSG Vance's death.

2/19 Special Forces Group (Airborne) second lieutenant (2LT) Michael Reffit initiated the historic flag ceremony by introducing Ana Paola Vergara, an accomplished lyric soprano originally from Mexico City, who sang the National Anthem while members of the 2/19 Special Forces Group Color Guard raised the flag.

After the ceremony, country music singer Cody Clayton Eagle sang his song “This Ones on Me” in honor of the military and military families. A prayer was then delivered by Major Justin Elliot, followed by the laying of the wreath by NSDAR Woodburn Chapter Regent, Joan Gibson. Greetings and proclamations were all announced on behalf of Governor Jim Justice, Senator Shelley Moore Capito and Senator Joe Manchin with comments made by WVU's Director of Local Government Relations, Ron Justice and West Virginia's Patriot Ride Guard Captain, Doug Geary.

== History ==
Gene Arden (“Buddy”) Vance Jr. was a native of the State of West Virginia, a West Virginia University alumnus, a City of Morgantown, West Virginia resident and decorated national hero who was a member of the West Virginia Army National Guard (WVARNG) 2nd Battalion, 19th Special Forces Group Airborne Forces. Vance was a cryptologic linguist who, despite being critically wounded, helped save the lives of two fellow Americans and 18 Afghan soldiers during the hunt for Osama bin Laden in the War in Afghanistan (2001–14).

Founded in the City of Morgantown on May 18, 2012, ten years following Vance's fatal shooting, it was created by the Gene Vance Jr. Foundation's founder Michael M.J. Minc, Vance's brother-in-law, with support from officials representing West Virginia, Morgantown, West Virginia Army National Guard, West Virginia University, business and media organizations.

Remembrances at select military installations bearing Vance's name throughout the United States are also held to coincide with the day. In 2019 the town of Oceana, West Virginia joined the City of Morgantown in declaring May 18 Gene Vance Jr. Day.

The day often coincides with US Armed Forces Day and on occasion National Police Week. Annual addresses by both military and police leadership highlight the importance of community service. In the City of Morgantown, home of West Virginia University, the former chief of police Edward Preston is also a US Marine and published author.

Officially designated by Congress in 1999, Military Appreciation Month takes place every year throughout the entire month of May. Every year, the president issues an annual proclamation reminding Americans to celebrate this patriotic month that pays tribute to those who have sacrificed much for freedom.

== Annual participants of the Gene Vance Jr. Day ==
NATIONAL BODIES

- United States Senate
- U.S. Department of Defense (DoD)United States Army Special Forces
- U.S. Department of Defense (DoD), Defense Language Institute (DFLI)
- U.S. Department of Defense (DoD), Goodfellow Air Force Base (USAF)
- U.S. Department of Defense (DoD) West Virginia National Guard (WVNG)
- Daughters of the American Revolution (NSDAR, DAR)
- Patriot Guard Riders (PGR)
- Gene Vance Jr. Foundation (GVJF)

STATE BODIES

- West Virginia Legislature
- Governors of West Virginia
- West Virginia University (WVU)

LOCAL BODIES

- City of Morgantown, West Virginia
- Town of Oceana, West Virginia
