= Robert Kerns =

Robert Kerns may refer to:

- Robert Kerns (baritone) (1933–1989), American baritone
- Robert Kerns (academic), American clinical psychologist, academic and author
- Bob Kerns (1930–1991), American politician, member of the Nevada Assembly

== See also ==
- Robert Kearns (disambiguation)
