= List of presidents of West Virginia University =

President of West Virginia University
- Incumbent; Michael T. Benson since 2025
- Appointer: West Virginia University Board of Governors
- Formation: 1867
- First holder: Alexander Martin (1867–1875)
- Website: Office of the President

This list of presidents of West Virginia University includes all who have served as president of West Virginia University.

== Presidents ==
No.	Image	President	Term start	Term end	Ref.
President of the Agricultural College of West Virginia (1867–1868)
1		Alexander Martin	1867	1875	
Presidents of West Virginia University (1868-present)
2		John Rhey Thompson	1877	1881	
3		William Lyne Wilson	1882	1883	
4		Eli Marsh Turner	1885	1893	
5		James Lincoln Goodknight	1895	1897	
6		Jerome Hall Raymond	1897	1901	
7		Daniel Boardman Purinton	1901	1911	
8		Thomas Edward Hodges	1911	1914	
9		Frank Butler Trotter	1916	1928	
10		John Roscoe Turner	1928	1934	
11		Chauncey Samuel Boucher	1935	1938 (Note: Resigned to lead the University of Nebraska.)	
12		Charles Elmer Lawall	1939	1945	
acting		Charles Thompson Neff, Jr.	September 1, 1945	August 31, 1946	
13		Irvin Stewart	July 1, 1946	August 25, 1958	
acting		Clyde L. Colson	August 26, 1958	January 31, 1959	
14		Elvis Jacob Stahr	February 1, 1959	January 22, 1961 (Note: Resigned to become United States Secretary of the Army after technically being on a 4-month "leave of absence".)	
acting		Clyde L. Colson	January 23, 1961 (Note: This is the first day when Colson was on his own while Stahr began work at the Pentagon.)	December 31, 1961	
15		Paul Ausborn Miller	January 1, 1962	August 14, 1966 (Note: Resigned to become Assistant Secretary for Education in the U.S. Department of Health Education and Welfare.)	
acting		Harry Bruce Heflin	August 15, 1966	August 31, 1967	
16		James Gindling Harlow	September 1, 1967	June 30, 1977	
17		Gene Budig	July 1, 1977	June 30, 1981 (Note: Resigned to lead the University of Kansas.)	
interim 18		Harry Bruce Heflin	July 1, 1981	November 15, 1981	
19		E. Gordon Gee (Note: Gee is the only person to serve two non-consecutive terms as WVU president.)	November 16, 1981	June 30, 1985 (Note: Resigned to lead University of Colorado.)	
interim 20		Diane L. Reinhard	July 1, 1985	March 14 1986	
21		Neil S. Bucklew	March 15, 1986	June 30, 1995	
22		David C. Hardesty, Jr.	July 1, 1995	August 31, 2007	
23		Mike Garrison	September 1, 2007	July 31, 2008 (Note: Forced to resign.)	
interim 24		C. Peter Magrath	August 1, 2008	June 29, 2009	
25		James P. Clements	June 30, 2009	December 30, 2013 (Note: Resigned to lead Clemson University.)	
interim		E. Gordon Gee	December 31, 2013	March 3, 2014	
26		E. Gordon Gee	March 3, 2014	July 14, 2025	
27		Michael T. Benson	July 15, 2025	present	

Table notes:

== See also ==
- List of people from Morgantown, West Virginia
- List of West Virginia University alumni
