= Gene Arden Vance Jr. =

American soldier (1963–2002)

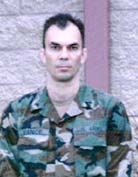
- Born: Gene Arden Vance Jr. November 30, 1963; Frankfurt, Germany
- Died: May 18, 2002 (aged 38); Afghanistan (KIA)
- Burial place: Morgantown, West Virginia
- Military career
- Allegiance: United States of America
- Branch: United States Army; United States Army Reserve; United States National Guard
- Service years: 1983–90; Reservist 1992–2002
- Rank: Staff sergeant (posthumously)
- Nicknames: "Buddy"; "Bud"
- Unit: 19th Special Forces Group
- Conflicts: Persian Gulf War; War on terror; War in Afghanistan
- Awards: Legion of Merit; Bronze Star(2nd Award); Purple Heart; Army Achievement Medal; Good Conduct Medal (2nd Award); Army Reserve Component Achievement Medal; National Defense Service Medal; Armed Forces Reserve Medal with “M” Device; West Virginia Distinguished Service Medal; West Virginia Distinguished Unit Award

Gene Arden (“Buddy”) Vance Jr. (November 30, 1963 – May 18, 2002) was an American soldier, a member of a US Special Forces Airborne Army National Guard Unit who, despite being critically wounded, saved the lives of two fellow Americans and 18 Afghan soldiers during the War in Afghanistan (2001–2021). Vance's actions, life story, heroism and death were widely publicized in the mainstream media and is featured in several books on the war on terrorism as well as in the ABC reality series "Profiles from the Front Line".

Vance was the first member of the National Guard of the United States to be killed in direct action since a New Hampshire National Guard soldier was killed in Vietnam in 1969. He was also the first West Virginia National Guardsman to be killed in action since World War II and the first U.S. Army graduate of Goodfellow Air Force Base's cryptography training to be killed in action while taking part in Operation Enduring Freedom. Vance was the first alumni of The Defense Language Institute Foreign Language Center Presidio of Monterey to be killed in combat since the terrorist attacks on the US of September 2001.

Both federal and state leaders in the United States government have inscribed Vance into US history as a national hero. Two US military intelligence staff buildings, a military camp in Bagram, Afghanistan, a US state bridge, a US based non-profit organization, an annual US citywide memorial day, biometric laboratory, hall of honor, city/mountain bike path, trademarked coffee label, and memorial drive have been named in his honor. He received 17 awards and decorations including the US Army Purple Heart, two Bronze Star Medals with and the Legion of Merit that recognizes exceptionally meritorious conduct in the performance of sustained, superior achievement.

== Early, family and personal life ==
Vance was born on November 30, 1963, in Frankfurt, Germany. He was the first born son of Gene Arden Vance Sr., a retired US army officer and member of the Green Berets who was a magistrate and sheriff of Wyoming County, West Virginia and June Carol Steele from neighboring McDowell County, WV who is a retired registered nurse teaching nursing in the United States. The Vance's also had two younger children, Gene Jr.’s siblings, David and Jamie.

Vance is a member of a multi-generational US military family spanning four generations of service. His great uncles William ‘Bittle’ Steele, US Army 4th Infantry Division Bravo Company and Clarence 'Buck' England served in the Battle of the Bulge. His father Gene Sr. served with the LRRP and U.S. Special Forces as a captain in the Vietnam War and then with the Military Police in Thailand. Gene Sr. was described by the media as a lean, well-muscled lawman standing 6-foot-4, and 'ramrod straight'. His uncles William Edward Vance and James Ray Vance served in long term US military careers. Gene Vance Jr.'s younger brother David is a retired non-commissioned officer who served with the 101st Airborne performing two tours of duty in the Iraq War and whose son, Gene's nephew, serves in the US Navy. During his life Gene actively sought to continue his family's military legacy.

Gene A. Vance Jr. was described as a 6-foot-4 inches tall "mountaineer"- an avid outdoorsman and physical fitness, mountain biking, white water rafting, backpacking, kayaking, snowboarding and chess enthusiast. He kept much of his military life a secret from friends and family who believed he led what was described as two lives - a different life than people saw. He loved the Grateful Dead, John Prine and became well known to Dick Dale as one of his fans. He liked to wear Birkenstock sandals and Deadhead T-shirts in sharp contrast to his military life and secret government missions. The reason for Gene's secrecy was believed to be in part due to his modest nature and also to the secretive nature of his elite training as both a cryptologic linguist and a US Special Forces Reservist. Gene had specialty skills in translating intercepted foreign state communications and was honored by the NSA.

Vance was a student at West Virginia University and a 1981 graduate of Oceana High School (West Virginia) in Wyoming County, where he was voted "most quiet" in his high school senior class. From all accounts he was a strong, shy, selfless, pleasant, gentle and quiet man who loved a wide variety of rock and roll music, and dark roast coffee.

Vance had a daughter, Amber, from a previous marriage, and was married to Lisa Selmon Vance at the time of his death. Vance's personal communications with his wife during wartime service were featured in a book entitled ‘Behind The Lines’ by author Andrew Carroll.

== 9/11 ==
At the time of the September 11 terrorist attacks on the United States, Vance was living in Morgantown, West Virginia. He was newly married and about to go on his honeymoon. He was also just beginning a new semester at West Virginia University and managed one of West Virginia's largest sporting goods stores in the city.

Among the U.S. Army responses to the September 11 terrorist attacks was the activation of the 2nd Battalion, 19th Special Forces Group, (Airborne). Vance served with the West Virginia Army National Guard element of the battalion. Vance cancelled his honeymoon and put his studies on hold to go to war. Vance's Persian language, cryptologic and special forces skills, harnessed at the start of the war in Afghanistan, were rare and distinguished him from the majority of the US Army.

Vance's skills became vital to operations against the Taliban and Al-Qaeda terrorists.

== Military career ==
Vance attended Basic and Advanced Individual Training at Fort Gordon, Ga., for Communications Systems Circuit Controller in 1983. In 1988, he completed the Primary Leadership Development Course at Fort Ord, Ca. and then served in various active-duty assignments both in the United States and overseas from June 1983 until June 1990.

Vance's military education included:

- The Communication System Circuit Course
- The Primary Leadership Development Course
- The Petroleum Supply Specialist Course
- The Basic Airborne Course
- The Special Forces Command Basic Non commissioned Officer Course
- Advanced International Morse Code
- The Persian Language Course

Vance was awarded his first Bronze Star for Valor for his actions in the Persian Gulf War then joined the Army Reserves as a supply specialist in the 646th Quartermaster Company, Kingwood, W.Va., from January 1992 until October 1992. During this period, he completed the Petroleum Supply Specialist Course. He then joined Company C, 2nd Battalion, 19th Special Forces Group (Airborne), in October 1992. In 1994, he transferred to Support Company, 2nd Battalion, 19th Special Forces Group (Airborne). He was later awarded the military occupational skill of voice interceptor in 2001. After the events on September 11, 2001, Vance's special forces unit was activated.

According to the US Military, Staff Sergeant Vance's patrol was ambushed on 18 May 2002 by Taliban fighters in the vicinity of Shkin, Paktika Afghanistan while taking part in Operation Mountain Lion. Although critically wounded in the initial attack, Staff Sergeant Vance continued to translate battlefield intelligence for Afghan forces in the area, directing them out of danger. For his actions Vance received multiple awards and decorations. He had also played a critical role in developing his detachment's communications capabilities in the US-led efforts to capture Osama Bin Laden.

== Death, memorials and tributes ==
- On May 18, 2002, Vance died from a gunshot wound to the chest according to official military reports and was posthumously promoted to Staff Sergeant. Varied accounts and reports surrounding Vance's death were widespread in the media immediately upon his death.
- On Saturday, May 26, 2002, the day before US Memorial Day approximately 1,000 people including state, national military and government officials, attended Vance's memorial service held in his hometown of Morgantown, West Virginia. West Virginia University President David C. Hardesty, Jr., bestowed upon Vance an honorary Bachelor of Arts degree from the university which Vance had attended before his deployment to Afghanistan saying that Vance represented "a potent combination of the ordinary and extraordinary." Former US Senator John D. Rockefeller IV of West Virginia was in office as the senate intelligence committee chairman at the time of Vance's death. He paid tribute to Vance's service saying that Americans who enjoy the freedoms and comforts their society provides must never forget that they do so because of men such as Sergeant Vance. US Senators, Joe Manchin III and Shelley Moore Capito of West Virginia have paid tribute to Vance by honoring his actions to 'fight terror in the name of freedom'.
- On July 14, 2002, the State of West Virginia named the Oceana Junction Bridge at the intersection of State Route 85 and State Route 10, in Oceana, Wyoming County, West Virginia, the SSG Gene Arden Vance, Jr., Memorial Bridge.
- In December 2002, Camp Vance, Bagram, Afghanistan located 1.4 km from the airfield at Bagram Air Base, was formed and headquartered the Combined Joint Special Operations Task Force Afghanistan.
- In May 2003, the year following Vance's death, the US National Security Agency engraved Vance's name on the NSA/CSS Cryptologic Memorial Wall, which honors the 153 cryptologists who have given their lives in the performance of their duties since World War II. That same year the second episode of the ABC reality series Profiles from the Front Line, produced by Warner Bros. and Jerry Bruckheimer Television, aired and featured the death of Sgt. Vance in the war.
- In 2003, the City of Morgantown, WV named a portion of the Deckers Creek Trail which is part of the city's historical rail trail, The Vance Mile.
- In 2005, a revised and expanded English hard cover translation of a French language book Sur les traces d'al-qaida (On the trail of Al Qaeda) was published by Zenith Press. It was entitled Hunting al Queda and was authored by several members of 'Beast 85', the code name of a Special Forces team from the 20th Special Forces Group, which deployed to Afghanistan in May 2002 and had become involved in the incident that claimed Vance's life.
- On August 25, 2006, a newly constructed building was named Vance Barracks at the Defense Language Institute Foreign Language Center and Presidio of Monterey in California. US Congressman Sam Farr of California helped secure funding for the building honoring Vance. The congressman described the war on terrorism as a new war because it is unlike conventional warfare and asymmetrical, requiring the US military to think differently, develop capability and forces that can adapt quickly to unexpected circumstances.
- On December 21, 2006, Vance's brother in-law, Michael M. J. Minc formed the Gene Vance Jr. Foundation for the Catastrophically Injured in response to US soldiers returning home from the war on terrorism with severely disfiguring injuries. The Foundation established in Vance's honor is an all volunteer, medical humanitarian non-profit organization leading an initiative entitled Operation Total Restoration that marshals the forces of military and civilian specialists to help advance care for the war wounded and traumatically injured. In 2011, the Naval Medical Center San Diego presented the foundation with a certificate of appreciation for their leader's unyielding volunteer dedication to the advancement of medicine and commitment to education in Vance's name that has elevated the standard of care and expanded treatment options for the community and the United States Navy during a time of armed conflict.
- On April 24, 2007 Goodfellow Air Force Base in Texas named the 344th Military Intelligence Battalion Headquarters Building on West Vance Street the Vance-Nolan Military Intelligence Building honoring two American soldiers: Staff Sgt. Vance of Morgantown, West Virginia, who was the first U.S. Army graduate of Goodfellow Air Force Base's cryptologic training to be killed in action while taking part in Operation Enduring Freedom. and Sgt. Joseph M. Nolan of Waterbury, Connecticut who was the first U.S. Army graduate of the Goodfellow Air Force Base's cryptologic training to be killed in action while taking part in Operation Iraqi Freedom.
- On March 30, 2008, the SSG Gene Arden Vance Jr and SG DeForest Lee Talbert Hall of Honor located inside the Camp Dawson Headquarters building, was dedicated in tribute honoring these two American soldiers displaying all the flags of the world atop the wall that prominently bears their names. Sgt. DeForest L. Talbert of Charleston, W.Va. died on July 27, 2004, while serving in operation Iraqi Freedom.
- On August 21, 2008, the Department of Defense Biometrics Task Force (redesignated as the Biometrics Identity Management Agency in 2010) Gene Vance Biometrics Experimentation Center at Camp Dawson (West Virginia) was dedicated in honor of Vance to house the biometrics experimentation capabilities and communications vehicle.
- On May 18, 2012, US Armed Forces Day and ten years following Vance's fatal shooting, a new day in the United States of America called the Gene Vance Jr. Day was founded in Vance's hometown. It was created by the Gene Vance Jr. Foundation with support from officials representing the State of West Virginia, City of Morgantown, West Virginia Army National Guard, West Virginia University, business and media organizations to honor the legacy of American soldiers who returned home from the longest ongoing war in US history, remembers the fallen and supports the wounded in honor of their hometown hero. Framed by Memorial Day and Armed Forces Day in the United States, the day is observed annually in Morgantown on May 18.
- On May 1, 2012, the United States Patent and Trademark Office registered the trademark "Bud's Bold Brew Coffee" that contained a portrait of Vance in his honor.
- On May 22, 2016, the 15th anniversary year of 9/11, the City of Morgantown, WV designated a memorial highway in Vance's honor named the Gene Arden Vance Jr. Memorial Drive.
- On May 16, 2020, US Armed Forces Day, amidst the COVID-19 pandemic, founder Michael M.J. Minc spearheaded the 9th annual Gene Vance Jr. Day by creating a virtual event. Entitled ‘United in Spirit’ it brought together government leaders like Senators Joseph Manchin III and Shelley Moore Capito, military leaders like Adjutant General of the West Virginia Army National Guard, Major General James A. Hoyer, education leader E. Gordon Gee as well as healthcare, multi denominational religious leaders along with musical performers that included American Idol contestant and country musician, Cody Clayton Eagle, an 18-year-old Morgantown high school senior.
- On May 15, 2021, U.S. Armed Forces Day, amidst a continuing pandemic during the 20th Anniversary year of the September 11 attacks and the 10th Anniversary celebration of the Gene Vance Jr. Day, Michael M.J. Minc, collectively as Vance's brother in-law, founder and leader of the Gene Vance Jr. Day, the Gene Vance Jr. Foundation and Bud's Bold Brew created a 2nd virtual tribute event entitled ‘United in Spirit 2021 American Tribute X’ The event received a commendation from members of congress and the 46th president of the United States, Joe Biden. President Biden, who is also commander-in-chief of the US Armed Forces, praised the Gene Vance Jr. Foundation's efforts aimed at improving the quality of life for wounded veterans in SSG Vance's name.
- On September 11, 2021, the 20th Anniversary of the September 11 attacks, the U.S. Patriot Day edition of the Charleston Gazette-Mail, a Pulitzer prize winning publication, published a tribute article to Vance's legacy on its front page in honor of Vance and the day.
- On May 21, 2022, US Armed Forces Day, amidst the 2022 Russian invasion of Ukraine during the 21st Anniversary year of 9/11 and the 11th Anniversary celebration of the Gene Vance Jr. Day, Vance's brother in-law, Michael M.J. Minc created a 3rd virtual event entitled ‘American Freedom Tribute XI' that honored the 20th anniversary of Gene Arden (“Buddy”) Vance Jr's death paying tribute to SSG Vance, the people and soldiers of Ukraine, American soldiers and their allies that are presently serving, war veterans who have fallen and those who are severely wounded.
- On May 29, 2022, the day before U.S. Memorial Day, NASCAR Cup Series paid tribute to SSG Vance's heroism at The Coca-Cola 600, an annual 600-mile (970 km) NASCAR Cup Series points race held at the Charlotte Motor Speedway in Concord, North Carolina, on a Sunday during U.S. Memorial Day weekend. Vance's name was carried by the grand marshal vehicle that lead the field. SSG Vance was one of several soldiers recognized by the grand marshal.
- On September 11 US National Day of Service and Remembrance and Patriot Day 2022, in recognition of the 20th Anniversary year of SSG Vance's death, the U.S. Special Forces Association Chapter 42 was renamed as the 'Gene Vance Jr./Pat St. Clair Special Forces Chapter 42 Association' at a 9/11 dedication ceremony held at F.O.P. Lodge 47 in Eighty-Four in Pennsylvania, US. The ceremony was to recognize the courage and sacrifice of fallen U.S. Special Forces SSG Gene Arden Vance Jr. It also honored the service of retired Command Sergeant major Pat St. Clair of Mt. Morris, Greene County, PA who took part in the raid of the Sơn Tây prison camp in North Vietnam in 1970 in an attempt to rescue some 61 American prisoners of war.
- On September 11, 2022, the 20th anniversary of SSG Vance's death, the last American flag to fly over Camp Vance, a longtime Special Forces HQ in Bagram during the war in Afghanistan, was presented to Jamie L. Vance-Minc and Michael M.J. Minc, Vance's sister and brother in-law, by the U.S. 10th Special Forces Group, Airborne on the 21st Anniversary of 9/11. The American flag that flew in honor of Vance at the military base that carried his name for two decades, traveled over 8,000 miles from Bagram to Fort Carson and was presented to Vance's family by Lieutenant Colonel Matt Chaney, who was the former commander of the 3rd Battalion, 10th Special Forces Group (Airborne) in Afghanistan the year Camp Vance was closed. The flag and Vance's legacy were to be honored on September 10, 2022, at West Virginia University, Vance's alma mater, as part of the events surrounding the historic West Virginia vs Kansas College football homecoming match. Due to family circumstances the presentation took place in a private ceremony.

== Awards and decorations ==
- Legion of Merit
- Bronze Star with "V" Device (2nd award)
- Purple Heart
- Army Achievement Medal (for his role in San Francisco's 1989 Loma Prieta earthquake)
- Good Conduct Medal (2nd Award)
- Army Reserve Component Achievement Medal
- National Defense Service Medal
- Armed Forces Reserve Medal with “M” Device
- Noncommissioned Officer Professional Development Ribbon
- Army Service Ribbon
- Overseas Service Ribbon
- Parachutist Badge
- West Virginia Distinguished Service Medal
- West Virginia State Service Ribbon
- West Virginia Distinguished Unit Award

== Works cited ==
- "C.A.R.E. Summit 2013". Comprehensive Aesthetic Restorative Effort Summit 2013. Navy Medical Center San Diego. 5 December 2013.
