= Robert Kearns (disambiguation) =

Robert Kearns (1927–2005) was an American engineer, educator and inventor.

Robert Kearns may also refer to:

- Robbie Kearns (born 1971), Australian rugby player
- Robert Kearns (musician), former member of The Bottle Rockets

== See also ==
- Robert Kerns (disambiguation)
