= Bill Neal (pediatric cardiologist) =

American pediatric cardiologist

- Born: William A. Neal; January 18, 1940; Huntington, West Virginia, U.S.
- Died: January 1, 2021 (aged 80); Morgantown, West Virginia, U.S.
- Education: Xavier University; West Virginia University
- Occupation: Pediatric cardiologist

William A. Neal (January 18, 1940 – January 1, 2021) was an American pediatric cardiologist.

== Life and career ==
Neal was born in Huntington, West Virginia, the son of William Leonard Neal and Mary Louise Eich. He attended and graduated from St. Joseph Central Catholic High School. After graduating, he attended Wheeling University and Xavier University, earning his BS degree in chemistry in 1962. He also attended the West Virginia University, earning his MD degree in 1966, which after earning his degrees, he worked at Milwaukee County General Hospital. He served in the United States Navy from 1967 to 1969.

Neal served as a professor in the department of pediatrics at West Virginia University from 1974 to 2014. During his years as a professor, he served as founding medical director of West Virginia University Medicine Children's Hospital, and was named the James H. Walker Professor of Preventive Cardiology.

== Death ==
Neal died at his home in Morgantown, West Virginia, on January 1, 2021, at the age of 80.
