= Roy Hawley =

Former american athletic director

Biographical details
- Born: February 12, 1901; Bluefield, West Virginia, U.S.
- Died: March 20, 1954 (aged 53); Morgantown, West Virginia, U.S.
- Education: West Virginia University

Administrative career (AD unless noted)
- 1926-1935: Marshall University
- 1938-1954: West Virginia University

Roy Hawley (February 12, 1901 – March 20, 1954) was an American athletic director from Bluefield, West Virginia.

== Early life and education ==
Hawley was born in Bluefield, West Virginia and graduated from Bluefield High School in 1921. During his high school career, he gained statewide attention for a 66-point performance in a 1918 basketball game against Williamson High School, an achievement that stood as a state record.

=== West Virginia University ===
==== Baseball ====
Hawley enrolled at West Virginia University in the early 1920s and became a standout player in both baseball and basketball. In baseball, he was a five-year letterwinner under renowned coach Ira Errett Rodgers. During his seasons with the Mountaineers, the team compiled a cumulative record of 62–54, including a 17–11 campaign in 1922 and a 13–10 season in 1925. Hawley served as team captain in 1926.

==== Basketball ====
Hawley spent four seasons with the Mountaineers, earning three varsity letters while playing at center for coach Francis Stadsvold. He averaged 5.9 points per game during the 1924 season, when the team finished 14–2. In total, he appeared in 60 games, scored 256 career points (a 4.3 average), and captained the 1925 team. Over his four seasons, WVU posted a combined 40–32 basketball record.

== Career ==
After graduating in 1926, Hawley began his professional athletics career at Marshall University, where he served as both baseball coach and athletic director. Hawley returned to West Virginia University in 1935 as alumni secretary and, in 1938, was appointed the institution’s fifth athletic director, succeeding Harry Stansbury. During his tenure, he oversaw significant developments in WVU athletics, including the university’s first unified conference participation when WVU joined the Southern Conference in 1950.

Hawley is widely credited with helping secure WVU’s invitation to the 1942 National Invitation Tournament (NIT). Drawing on his strong professional relationship with prominent New York basketball promoter Ned Irish, Hawley persuaded Irish to grant the eighth and final tournament berth to the Mountaineers. The Mountaineers, entering as the lowest seed, eliminated top-seeded Long Island University 58–49 in overtime, breaking LIU’s 42-game winning streak. WVU then defeated University of Toledo 51–39 in the semifinal before edging Western Kentucky University 47–45 in the championship game. A celebratory parade was held in Morgantown to honor the team’s 19–4 championship season.

Known informally as “The Hand” for his habit of greeting others with a firm handshake, Hawley was a highly visible and popular figure in WVU athletics. His office overlooked the old Mountaineer Field, giving him a vantage point from which he observed practices and games.

== Death and legacy ==
Hawley died on March 20, 1954, while still serving as athletic director. Soon after, WVU named its baseball facility Hawley Field in his honor. He received multiple honors during and after his career. He was inducted into the West Virginia Sports Hall of Fame in 1950 and posthumously enshrined in the National Association of Collegiate Directors of Athletics Hall of Fame in 1974.
