= West Virginia Sports Hall of Fame =

Athletics hall of fame

- Established: 1950
- Website: West Virginia Sports Writers Association

The West Virginia Sports Hall of Fame is an athletics hall of fame in the U.S. state of West Virginia. The inductees are selected by the West Virginia Sports Writers Association. As of 2025, there are a total of 193 members.

== Inductees ==
=== 2020s ===
Class	Name	Sport(s)	Note
2025	Nick Saban	Football	7x National (2003, 2009, 2011, 2012, 2015, 2017, 2020), 1x MAC (1990), 11x SEC (2001, 2003, 2009, 2012, 2014–2016, 2018, 2020, 2021, 2023), 16x SEC West (2001–2003, 2008, 2009, 2012–2018, 2020–2023), ESPY Icon Award (2024), George Munger Award (2016), Bobby Dodd Coach of the Year (2014), 3× Bobby Bowden Coach of the Year (2009, 2011, 2012), 2× Walter Camp Coach of the Year (2008, 2018), Home Depot Coach of the Year (2008), Sporting News Coach of the Year (2008), Liberty Mutual Coach of the Year (2008), 2× Paul "Bear" Bryant Award (2003, 2020), 2× AP College Football Coach of the Year (2003, 2008), 2× Eddie Robinson Coach of the Year (2003, 2008), 5× SEC Coach of the Year (2003, 2008, 2009, 2016, 2020)
2024	Kenny Griffith	Basketball	
2024	Bruce Meredith	Rifle Shooting	
2023	Mike Carey	Basketball	
2023	Jeff Hostetler	Football	
2022	Major Harris	Football	
2022	Darryl Talley	Football	
2021	Mike Barber	Football	
2021	Monte Cater	Football	

=== 2010s ===
Class	Name	Sport(s)	Note
2019	Randy Moss	Football	NFL Offensive Rookie of the Year (1998), NFL Comeback Player of the Year (2007), 4× First-team All-Pro (1998, 2000, 2003, 2007), 6× Pro Bowl (1998–2000, 2002, 2003, 2007), 5× NFL receiving touchdowns leader (1998, 2000, 2003, 2007, 2009), NFL 2000s All-Decade Team, NFL 100th Anniversary All-Time Team, Minnesota Vikings Ring of Honor, 50 Greatest Vikings, New England Patriots All-2000s Team, New England Patriots All-Dynasty Team, NCAA I-AA national champion (1996), Fred Biletnikoff Award (1997), Paul Warfield Trophy (1997), Unanimous All-American (1997), MAC Most Valuable Player (1997), MAC Offensive Player of the Year (1997); NFL records, Most receiving touchdowns in a season: 23 (2007), Most receiving touchdowns in a rookie season: 17 (1998)
2019	Chris Smith	Basketball	
2018	Calvin Bailey	Baseball	
2018	Roy Michael	Football	
2017	Carl Lee	Football	
2017	Lonnie Warwick	Football	
2016	Larry Shaw	Wrestling	
2016	Curt Warner	Football	
2015	Ed Pastilong	Football Administration	
2015	Ralph Tasker	Basketball Coach	
2014	Fern Kellmeyer	Tennis	
2014	Bob Pruett	Football	
2013	Charles Cowan	Football	
2013	Dennis Harrah	Football	
2012	Vicky Bullett	Basketball	
2012	Mary Ostrowski	Basketball	
2011	Bimbo Coles	Basketball	
2011	Arnett Mumford	Football	
2010	Randy Barnes	Track and Field (Shot Put)	
2010	Ed Etzel	Rifle Shooting	

=== 2000s ===
Class	Name	Sport(s)	Note
2008	Earl Lloyd	Basketball	NBA champion (1955), CIAA "Player of the Decade" for the 1940s, NAIA Silver and Golden Anniversary Teams
2008	Mary Lou Retton	Gymnastics	
2006	Gale Catlett	Basketball	
2006	Don Nehlen	Football	Big East Champion (1993), Walter Camp Coach of the Year Award (1988), Bobby Dodd Coach of the Year Award (1988), AFCA Coach of the Year (1988), Big East Coach of Year (1993), Amos Alonzo Stagg Award (2017)
2004	Lewis D’Antoni	Basketball	
2004	Clyde Green	Basketball	
2002	Jennings Boyd	Basketball	
2000	Robert Wilson Jr.	Football	
2000	William Young	Football	

=== 1990s ===
Class	Name	Sport(s)	Note
1998	Samuel LeRose	Administration	
1998	Buzzy Wilkinson	Basketball	
1996	Ray McCoy	Football	
1996	Roy Williams	Football	
1994	Robert Dutton	Football	
1994	Wilbur Sortet	Football	
1994	Carl Ward	Football	
1992	Stanley Romanoski	Football	
1991	Willie Akers	Basketball	
1991	John McKay	Football	4x National (1962, 1967, 1972, 1974), 9x AAWU/Pac-8 (1962, 1964, 1966–1969, 1972–1974), 2× AFCA Coach of the Year (1962, 1972), 2× Eddie Robinson Coach of the Year (1962, 1972), Sporting News College Football COY (1972), Tampa Stadium Krewe of Honor (1991), Tampa Bay Buccaneers' Ring of Honor (2010)
1990	Burdell Carey	Football	
1990	Berridge Copen	Football	

=== 1980s ===
Class	Name	Sport(s)	Note
1989	Jim Braxton	Football	
1989	William Calvert	Football	
1989	Franklin Ellsworth	Basketball	
1989	Louis Romano	Football	
1988	William Karr	Football	First-team All-Pro (1935), 2× NFL receiving touchdowns leader (1933, 1935)
1987	William Bonsall	Gymnastics	
1987	Herman Hoskins	Basketball	
1987	Joseph Retton	Basketball	
1987	Archie Talley	Basketball	
1986	Jack Glasscock	Baseball	
1986	Wilford Wilson	Football	
1985	Verlin Adams	Basketball	
1985	Leland Byrd	Basketball	
1985	Merrill Gainer	Football	
1985	Abe McLaughlin	Football	
1984	Rudy Baric	Basketball	
1984	Earl Corum	Football	
1984	Frank Gatski	Football	4× NFL champion (1950, 1954, 1955, 1957), 4× AAFC champion (1946–1949), 4× First-team All-Pro (1951–1953, 1955), Pro Bowl (1956), Cleveland Browns Ring of Honor, Marshall Thundering Herd No. 72 retired
1984	Buzz Nutter	Football	
1984	Gilbert Welch	Football	
1983	William Conde	Administration	
1983	Jim Forti	Basketball	
1983	Albert Gwynne	Basketball	
1983	Fred Schaus	Basketball	
1983	Fred Wyant	Football	
1982	Eugene Lamone	Football	
1982	Russ Thomas	Football	
1982	Wayne Underwood	Football	
1982	Norman Willey	Football	
1982	Ron Williams	Basketball	
1981	Eddie Bartrug	Football	
1981	Bob Roe	Football	
1980	Sally Carroll	Tennis	
1980	Carl Hartman	Football	
1980	Sam Jones	Basketball	
1980	Petie Martin	Football	
1980	Mickey McDade	Football	
1980	Rand McKinney	Football	
1980	Warren Pugh	Football	
1980	Charlie Slack	Basketball	
1980	George Springer	Football	
1980	Lionel Taylor	Football	
1980	David Tork	Track and Field	
1980	Walt Walowac	Basketball	

=== 1970s ===
Class	Name	Sport(s)	Note
1979	Michael Barrett	Football	
1979	Herbert Bosely	Basketball	
1979	Chuck Howley	Football	Super Bowl champion (VI), Super Bowl MVP (V), 5× First-team All-Pro (1966–1970), Second-team All-Pro (1971), 6× Pro Bowl (1965–1969, 1971), Dallas Cowboys Ring of Honor, 3× All-SoCon (1955–1957), West Virginia Mountaineers No. 66 retired
1979	Robert Jeter	Football	2× Super Bowl champion (I, II), 3× NFL champion (1965–1967), First-team All-Pro (1967), Second-team All-Pro (1968), 2× Pro Bowl (1967, 1969), Green Bay Packers Hall of Fame, National champion (1958), All-American (1959), First-team All-Big Ten (1959)
1979	Toddy Loudin	Football	
1979	Arthur Smith	Football	
1979	Rod Thorn	Basketball	As a player, NBA All-Rookie First Team (1964), 2× Consensus second-team All-American (1962, 1963), SoCon Player of the Year (1962), No. 44 retired by West Virginia Mountaineers, Third-team Parade All-American (1959). As an executive, NBA Executive of the Year (2002).
1979	Jerry West	Basketball	As a player NBA champion (1972), NBA Finals MVP (1969), 14× NBA All-Star (1961–1974), NBA All-Star Game MVP (1972), 10× All-NBA First Team (1962–1967, 1970–1973), 2× All-NBA Second Team (1968, 1969), 4× NBA All-Defensive First Team (1970–1973), NBA All-Defensive Second Team (1969), NBA scoring champion (1970), NBA assists leader (1972), NBA anniversary team (35th, 50th, 75th), No. 44 retired by Los Angeles Lakers, NCAA Final Four Most Outstanding Player (1959), 2× Consensus first-team All-American (1959, 1960), Third-team All-American – AP, UPI (1958), SoCon Player of the Year (1959, 1960), No. 44 retired by West Virginia Mountaineers, Presidential Medal of Freedom (2019). As an executive, 8× NBA champion (1980, 1982, 1985, 1987, 1988, 2000, 2015, 2017), 2× NBA Executive of the Year (1995, 2004)
1978	Russ Craft	Football	2× NFL champion (1948, 1949), 2× Pro Bowl (1951, 1952), Second-team All-SEC (1942)
1978	Hal Greer	Basketball	NBA champion (1967), 10× NBA All-Star (1961–1970), NBA All-Star Game MVP (1968), 7× All-NBA Second Team (1963–1969), No. 15 retired by Philadelphia 76ers, NBA anniversary team (50th, 75th), First-team All-MAC (1958), No. 16 retired by Marshall Thundering Herd
1978	Stephen Harrick	Football	
1978	Floyd Schwartzwalder	Football	National Champion (1959), AFCA Coach of the Year (1959), Eddie Robinson Coach of the Year (1959), Amos Alonzo Stagg Award (1977)
1978	Fred Simons	Football	
1977	Neal Baisi	Football	
1977	Red Brown	Football	
1977	Flash Clarke	Football	
1977	Deacon Duvall	Football	
1977	Pud Hutson	Football	
1977	Dyke Raese	Football	
1977	Lefty Seabright	Football	
1976	Dick Huffman	Football	
1976	Jackie Hunt	Football	
1975	Bruce Bosley	Football	
1975	Wilbur Cooper	Baseball	
1975	Sam Huff	Football	
1975	George King	Football	
1974	Lew Burdette	Baseball	
1974	Mark Cardwell	Basketball	
1974	Glenn Davis	Track and Field	
1974	Frank Gatski	Football	
1974	Rex Pyles	Football	
1974	Coach Shroyer	Football	
1974	Mark Workman	Basketball	
1973	Feets Barnum	Basketball	
1973	Bob Gain	Football	
1973	Joe Miller	Football	
1973	Russ Parsons	Football	
1973	Ed Tutwiler (golfer)	Golf	
1972	George Cafego	Football	
1972	Bill Campbell	Golf	
1972	Arthur Clyde	Football	
1972	Mud Hite	Football	
1971	John Abramovic	Basketball	
1971	Babe Barna	Baseball	
1971	Leo Byrd	Basketball	
1971	Edward Davis	Football	
1971	Rezzy Rezzonico	Football	
1971	Riv Rivlin	Basketball	
1971	Denny Shute	Golf	
1970	Joe Bartell	Football	
1970	Beck Beckelheimer	Football	
1970	Biz Dawson	Football	
1970	Irish Garrity	Football	
1970	Bob Kay	Football	
1970	John Zontini	Football	

=== 1960s ===
Class	Name	Sport(s)	Note
1969	Red Edwards	Football	
1969	Russ Meredith	Football	
1969	Sam Snead	Golf	
1968	Adolph Hamblin	Football	
1968	Hot Rod Hundley	Basketball	2× NBA All-Star (1960, 1961), Consensus first-team All-American (1957), Consensus second-team All-American (1956), SoCon Player of the Year (1957), No. 33 retired by West Virginia Mountaineers
1967	Mont McIntire	Football	
1967	Dick Nebinger	Football	
1966	Skeet Farley	Football	
1966	Art Lewis	Football	
1965	Clair Bee	Basketball	
1965	Scotty Hamilton	Football	
1965	Dick Hoblitzell	Baseball	
1964	Clifford Jackson	Football	
1964	Eddie King	Track and Field	
1964	Raymond R. Shumaker	Football	
1964	John Stuart	Football	
1964	Cy Young	Football	
1963	Jasper Colebank	Football	
1963	Marshall Goldberg	Football	Second-team All-Pro (1941), NFL All-Star (1941), 2× NFL kickoff return yards leader (1941, 1942), NFL interceptions co-leader (1941), Arizona Cardinals Ring of Honor, Arizona Cardinals No. 99 retired, National champion (1937), Eastern champion (1937), Unanimous All-American (1938), Consensus All-American (1937), 2× First-team All-Eastern (1937, 1938), Second-team All-Eastern (1936), Pittsburgh Panthers No. 42 retired
1963	John Kellison	Football	
1963	Fritzi Quarrier	Tennis	
1963	Jerome Van Meter	Football	
1962	Nate Rohrbough	Football	
1962	Hol Slutz	Football	
1961	Marshall Glenn	Football	
1961	Carl Hamill	Football	
1960	Victor Brinkman	Football	
1960	Clarence Spears	Football	

=== 1950s ===
Class	Name	Sport(s)	Note
1959	Frank Wimer	Football	
1958	Sheriff Blake	Baseball	
1957	Lee Patton	Basketball	
1956	Jesse Burkett	Baseball	
1956	Marshall Glenn	Football	
1955	Cam Henderson	Basketball	Inventor of the 2–3 zone defense and Fast break
1955	Hack Wilson	Baseball	4× NL home run leader (1926–1928, 1930), 2× NL RBI leader (1929, 1930), MLB record 191 RBI, single season, Chicago Cubs Hall of Fame
1954	Roy Hawley	Basketball	
1954	Joe Stydahar	Football	
1953	Cebe Ross	Football	
1953	Harry Stansbury	Administration	
1950	Cliff Battles	Football	
1950	Rocco Gorman	Football	
1950	Greasy Neale	Football	
1950	Ira Rodgers	Football	
1950	Fielding Yost	Football	

== Statistics ==
=== Members per sport ===
The table below shows the number of individuals associated with each sport, based on their most notable involvement. For example, while Cam Henderson coached multiple sports at Marshall University, he is best known for pioneering the fast break and the 2–3 zone defense in basketball.

As of 2025
Sport	Inductee total
Football	123
Basketball	43
Baseball	10
Golf	4
Track and Field	4
Administration	3
Tennis	3
Gymnastics	2
Rifle	2
Wrestling	1
