= Kenneth Baer =

American speechwriter

Kenneth S. Baer (born October 17, 1972) is an American political advisor and author who served as associate director for Communications and Strategic Planning and Senior Advisor for White House's Office of Management and Budget from 2009 to 2012. He is the founder and co-editor of Democracy: A Journal of Ideas. Baer is a former White House speechwriter, author, and analyst. He is the CEO and Founder of the strategic communications firm, Crosscut Strategies.

== Early life and education ==
Baer graduated magna cum laude from the University of Pennsylvania, where he was elected to Phi Beta Kappa and was editorial page editor of The Daily Pennsylvanian. Afterward, Baer obtained a doctorate in Politics from the University of Oxford as a Thouron Scholar.

== Career ==
Baer was deputy director of Speechwriting for Al Gore 2000 presidential campaign and Senior Speechwriter for Vice President Al Gore. He also wrote on technology and telecommunications issues for Federal Communications Commission (FCC) Chairman William Kennard.

During the 2004 presidential election, he was a senior advisor to the Joe Lieberman 2004 presidential campaign and later advised the John Kerry 2004 presidential campaign. During the election, Baer was an online columnist for The American Prospect. He was also a contributor to the blog TPMCafe.

Following the election of President Barack Obama in 2008, he was named associate director for Communications and Strategic Planning for Peter R. Orszag, then director of the Office of Management and Budget. Baer remained in the position when Orszag resigned, and left OMB in July 2012.

In addition to running his own consultancy firm, Crosscut Strategies, he has taught at Georgetown University and at Johns Hopkins University.

Baer is the author of Reinventing Democrats.
