= Vance Barracks =

Coordinates: 36.6023°N 121.9127°W

- Presidio of Monterey, California, USA

Site information
- Owner: United States Department of Defense
- Operator: United States Army

Site history
- Built: 2005 - 2006
- Built for: Defense Language Institute
- Architect: TAM+CZ Architects, LLP
- In use: 2006-Present

Garrison information
- Garrison: Presidio of Monterey
- Occupants: Students of the Defense Language Institute

Vance Barracks at Presidio of Monterey is a military structure that houses students of the Defense Language Institute(DLI). The institute’s foreign language center is the primary tenant organization of the United States Army garrison Presidio of Monterey (POM) located in Monterey, California about 117 miles south of San Francisco, on the Pacific coast of the United States of America.

The barracks are named for Gene Arden Vance Jr., a US Special Forces graduate of the Defense Language Institute Foreign Language Center (DLIFLC) who, despite being critically wounded, used his language skills to help save the lives of two fellow Americans and 18 Afghani soldiers during the War in Afghanistan (2001–14). Vance was the first alumni of DLIFLC to be killed in combat since the terrorist attacks on the US of September 2001. The Barrack’s plaque, features Vance’s face sculpted in bronze with an inscription dedicated to his life and achievements.

Construction of the 2,823,098 sq. ft. barracks was overseen by the US Army Corps of Engineers and was completed in 2006 at an estimated cost of $8,800,000. The barracks were constructed to help improve the living conditions for DLI students and were specially designed to protect the occupants in the case of collapse by localizing failures without the continued collapse of the overall building.

A Ribbon–Cutting Ceremony marking the official opening of Vance Barracks took place on Friday, Aug. 25, 2006.
