= David C. Hardesty Jr. =

American lawyer

21st President of West Virginia University
- In office 1995–2007
- Succeeded by: Mike Garrison

Personal details
- Born: David Carter Hardesty Jr. 1946 (age 79–80)
- Spouse: Susan Brown Hardesty
- Education: West Virginia University (BA); University of Oxford (MA); Harvard University (JD)
- Profession: Lawyer, Academic administrator
- Website: West Virginia College of Law

David Carter Hardesty Jr. (born 1946) is an American lawyer and educator who was the 21st president of West Virginia University from 1995 to 2007.

== Education ==
As an undergraduate student at West Virginia University, Hardesty was student body president, a member of Phi Kappa Psi, and a Rhodes Scholar. Hardesty earned a B.A. from Oxford University in 1969 which was redesignated an M.A. in 1983. He received a J.D. from Harvard Law School in 1973.

== Career ==
He was a partner with Bowles, Rice, McDavid, Graff & Love from 1973 to 1995, and served as the Tax Commissioner of West Virginia from 1977 to 1980. Hardesty then began his twelve-year tenure as president of WVU. He is currently president emeritus and professor of law at West Virginia University.

== See also ==
- List of presidents of West Virginia University
