= Miles Bell =

U.S. talent manager

Miles Bell (1946 – March 19, 2008) was a Nashville-based talent manager. Over his 30-year career, Bell represented a broad range of talents, from illusionists to boy bands. His client list included Little Richard, Jeff Foxworthy, Harry Blackstone, Jr., Cledus T. Judd, Don McLean, Janis Ian, Kool & the Gang, Mickey Gilley, Sandy Hackett, The Commodores, Menudo, Tenor Gregor Praecht, The Moffatts, Mr. T and many others.

He was the executive director of 30 music videos of which two won the MTV Video Music Award for Video of the Year and two won the CMT Music Awards Video of the Year. Additionally, Bell served as the president of the National Association of Talent Directors (NATD) and was highly involved with Tennessee's Film and Television Committee. Bell was born and raised in Clarksburg, West Virginia and graduated from West Virginia University. He died in Nashville, Tennessee, at the age of 61, of renal failure.

Bell was father of three daughters, Megan, Melissa and Meredith.

== Curriculum vitae ==
- 1979–1991: President and CFO of Limeliters International - the largest provider of live entertainment to hotels and casinos in the United States
- 1985–1997: President and CEO of Worldwide Entertainment Services - the largest DJ service in the United States
- 1992–2000: President and CEO of Williams Bell & Associates - managed 36 artists and entertainers
- 1991–2008: President and CEO of Miles Bell & Associates - provider of live entertainment to major hotels, casinos, and cruise lines
