= Michael Tomasky =

American journalist (born 1960)

- Born: Michael John Tomasky; October 13, 1960 (age 66); Morgantown, West Virginia, U.S.
- Education: West Virginia University (BA); New York University (MA)

Michael John Tomasky (born October 13, 1960) is an American columnist, progressive commentator, and author. He is the editor of The New Republic and the editor in chief of Democracy. He has been a special correspondent for Newsweek, The Daily Beast, a contributing editor for The American Prospect, and a contributor to The New York Review of Books.

== Life and career ==
Tomasky was born and raised in Morgantown, West Virginia, the son of Maria (Aluisi) and Michael Tomasky, a trial attorney. He is of Serbian and Italian descent. He is a graduate of Morgantown High School. He attended West Virginia University as an undergraduate and then studied political science in graduate school at New York University. His work has also appeared in The New York Times Book Review, The Washington Post, Harper's Weekly, The Nation, The Village Voice, The New York Review of Books, Dissent, Lingua Franca, George, and GQ. He lives with his wife Sarah and daughter (Margot Julianna Kerr Tomasky, born July 6, 2010) in Silver Spring, Maryland.

From 1995 to 2002, Tomasky was a columnist at New York magazine, where he wrote the "City Politic" column. He was executive editor of liberal magazine The American Prospect, and remains a contributing editor. On October 23, 2007, Guardian America was launched with Tomasky as its editor. On March 3, 2009, he replaced Kenneth Baer as editor of U.S. political journal Democracy, at which time his title at The Guardian changed to editor-at-large. In May 2011 Tomasky left The Guardian to join Newsweek / The Daily Beast as a special correspondent. In 2021, Tomasky was named as the editor of The New Republic.

== Works ==
=== Books ===
- Tomasky, Michael (1996). Left for Dead: The Life, Death, and Possible Resurrection of Progressive Politics in America. Free Press. ISBN 978-0-684-82750-6.
- Tomasky, Michael (2001). Hillary's Turn: Inside Her Improbable, Victorious Senate Campaign. Free Press. ISBN 978-0-684-87302-2.
- Tomasky, Michael (2017). Bill Clinton: The American Presidents Series: The 42nd President, 1993-2001. Times Books. ISBN 978-1-62779-676-7.
- Tomasky, Michael (2019). If We Can Keep It: How the Republic Collapsed and How it Might Be Saved. W.W. Norton/Liveright Publishing. ISBN 978-1-631-49408-6.
- Tomasky, Michael (2022). The Middle Out: The Rise of Progressive Economics and a Return to Shared Prosperity. Doubleday. ISBN 978-0-385-54716-1.

=== Book reviews ===
- Tomasky, Michael (February 22, 2018). "The worst of the worst". The New York Review of Books. 65 (3): 4, 6, 8. Reviewed: Wolff, Michael. Fire and Fury: Inside the Trump White House. Henry Holt.; Frum, David. Trumpocracy: The Corruption of the American Republic. Harper.
