= Democracy (journal) =

Journal of progressive and liberal politics

Democracy: A Journal of Ideas
- Premier issue, summer 2006
- Type: Quarterly political magazine
- Format: Magazine
- Owner(s): Democracy: A Journal of Ideas, Inc.
- Publisher: Robert Abernethy
- Editor: Michael Tomasky
- Associate editor: Delphine d’Amora
- Managing editor: Jack Meserve
- Founded: 2006
- Political alignment: Progressive / Liberal
- Language: English
- Headquarters: Washington, D.C.
- ISSN: 1931-8693
- Website: democracyjournal.org

Democracy is as an American quarterly political journal. As of 2023, its website describes its focus as not being on policy papers but on bigger-picture, outside the box thinking.

== Founding ==
It was founded as a forum for progressive and liberal ideas by Kenneth Baer and Andrei Cherny in 2006. Modeled after conservative journals like Commentary and The National Interest, the editors put forward Democracy as "a place where ideas can be developed and important debates can be spurred" at a "time when American politics has grown profoundly unserious."

Baer told The Hill: "We think that the [Democratic] party is rich in tactics and poor in ideas. What we really need for long-term success is deep, serious thinking about how we’re going to apply long-held progressive values to new challenges." Cherny added: "I had started thinking about where all of the conservative ideas, for better or worse, had come from. Every big idea — Social Security privatization, supply-side economics, preemption, faith-based initiatives — had come out of one of their journals in their intellectual infrastructure."

In an editorial for the Los Angeles Times on July 10, 2006, Baer and Cherny laid out a case for making a break with what they characterized as the "ad hoc approach to politics" they claim the current Democratic Party is engaged in.

== Editors ==
On March 3, 2009, Michael Tomasky replaced Kenneth Baer as editor when Baer left to become associate director of the White House's Office of Management and Budget.

New York Times reporter and author Clay Risen was formerly the journal's managing editor.
