= Lee Patton =

American basketball coach

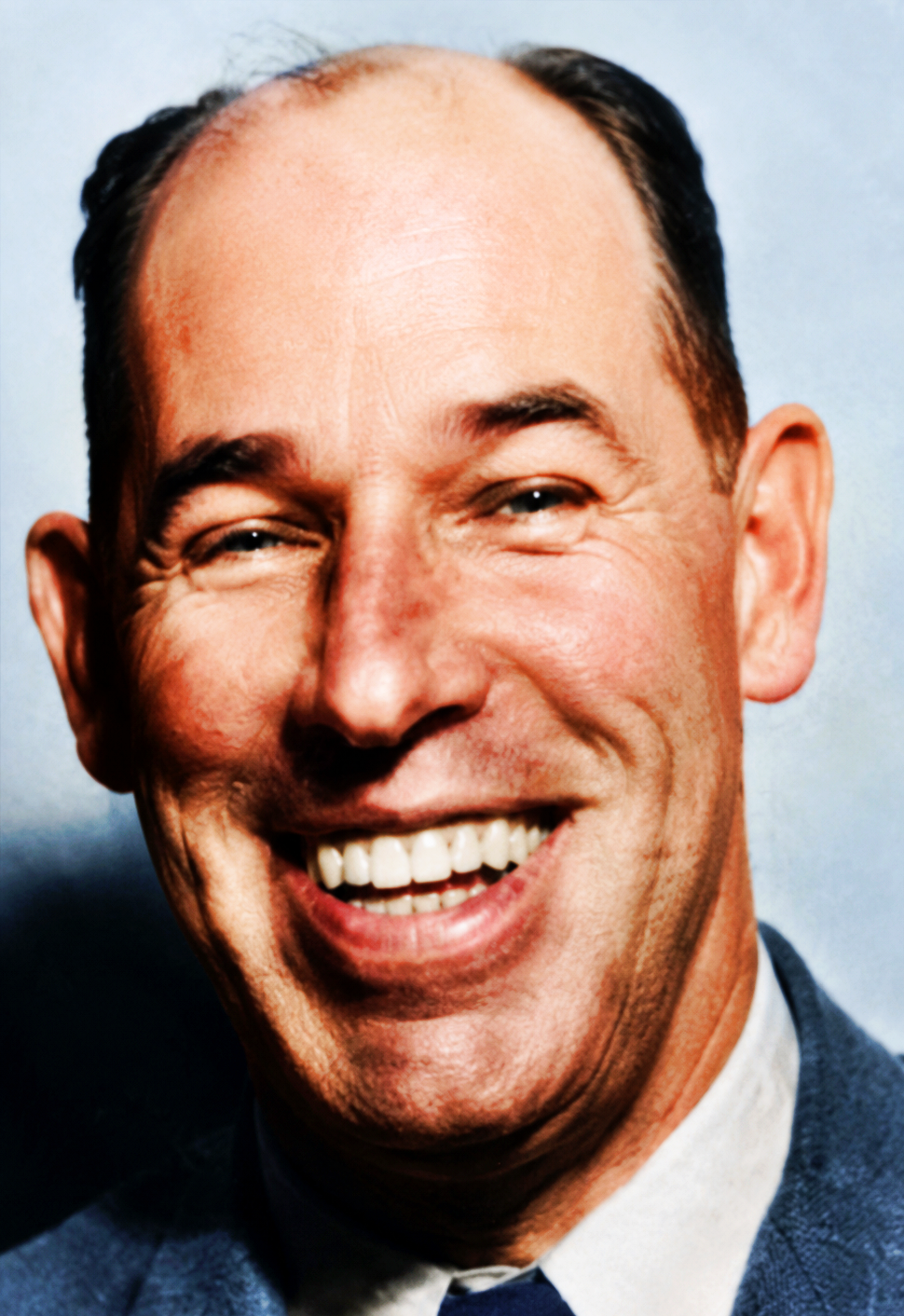

Biographical details
- Born: April 3, 1904; Carbon, Texas, U.S.
- Died: March 8, 1950 (aged 45); Morgantown, West Virginia, U.S.
- Education: Sul Ross State College; Northern Arizona University; Springfield College

Head coaching record
- Overall: WVU basketball: 95.5% (at home); 77.8% (away/home); Ash Fork High School: 81% (basketball); Princeton High School: 65% (football), 71% (basketball); Iona Prep: Undefeated (football), 68.4% (basketball).

Accomplishments and honors

Awards
- West Virginia Sports Hall of Fame (1957); WVU Sports Hall of Fame (2004); Princeton High School Sports Hall of Fame; Numerous coach of the year awards earned during his years at PHS

Records
- WVU BASKETBALL: Highest percent of home wins in school history (95.3%). Longest streak of home wins (57 games). Most seasons and highest percent of seasons with 85% or more wins. Most basketball players in WVU Sports Hall of Fame. Launched WVU Basketball's Era of Excellence (19 consecutive winning seasons with overall win/loss record of 76.5%).

Lee Lafayette Patton (April 3, 1904 – March 8, 1950) was an American sports coach. Known as Worry Bird and the Bald Eagle, Patton was a popular, highly successful head basketball coach at West Virginia University from his first season in 1945/46 until his death from a car crash in 1950. Patton's teams were noted for their physical and mental fitness, fast break offenses, man-to-man defenses, fundamentals, sportsmanship, and team unity. Coach Patton set numerous records in sports that remain unbroken.

== Early life and education ==
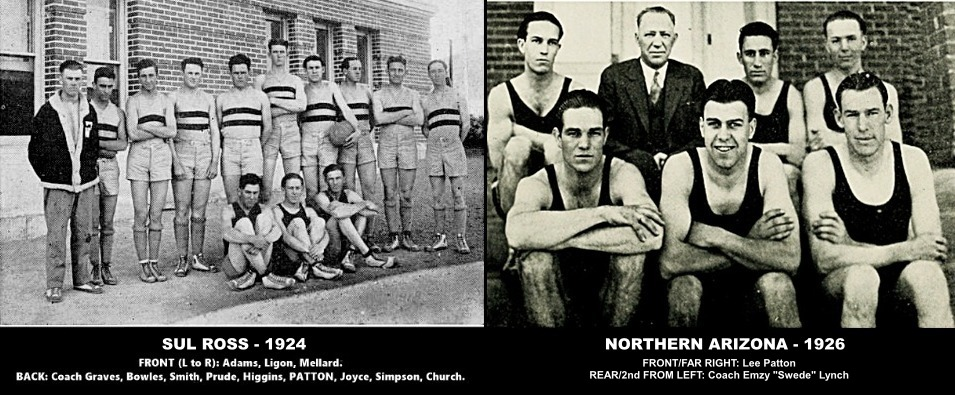
Lee Patton in the Northern Arizona yearbook

Lee Patton was born in Carbon, Texas, and spent his early childhood in the railroad construction camps of Texas. When his parents divorced, six-year-old Lee, his twelve-year-old sister Florence, and twenty-eight-year-old mother Laura moved to East Dallas. There, as the son of a single mother and an absentee railroad laborer (gandy dancer), Lee was not accorded the opportunities of those from more established, affluent families. Although excluded from high school sports, Lee took advantage of humanics-based YMCA programs and various sports leagues to advance his athletic ambitions.

After graduating from high school (two years at Bryan Street High School in Dallas and one year at Main Avenue High in San Antonio), Lee earned a scholarship and a two-year degree at Sul Ross State Teachers College (now Sul Ross University), where he excelled in football and basketball. Lee then earned a scholarship and four-year degree at Northern Arizona State Teachers College (now Northern Arizona University), where he excelled in academics and all sports. Following graduation in 1927 from Northern Arizona and two years of coaching championship basketball at Ash Fork High School in Arizona, Lee married Agnes Bretton on July 5, 1929.

== Springfield College and humanics ==
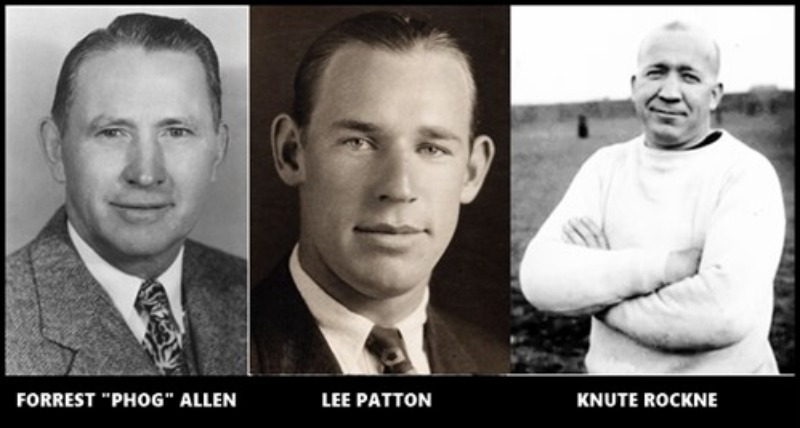
Lee Patton at Springfield College in 1930

In August 1929, Lee departed Arizona to enroll in the master's program of Culture and Athletics at the International YMCA College (now Springfield College) where he studied under Knute Rockne and Phog Allen, among others.

In August 1930, Lee graduated with honors and a strong dedication to humanics. Although Springfield graduates were heavily recruited by the nation's most elite prep schools, Lee Patton chose to accept an offer from Princeton High School in southern West Virginia.

== Princeton High School and Iona Prep ==
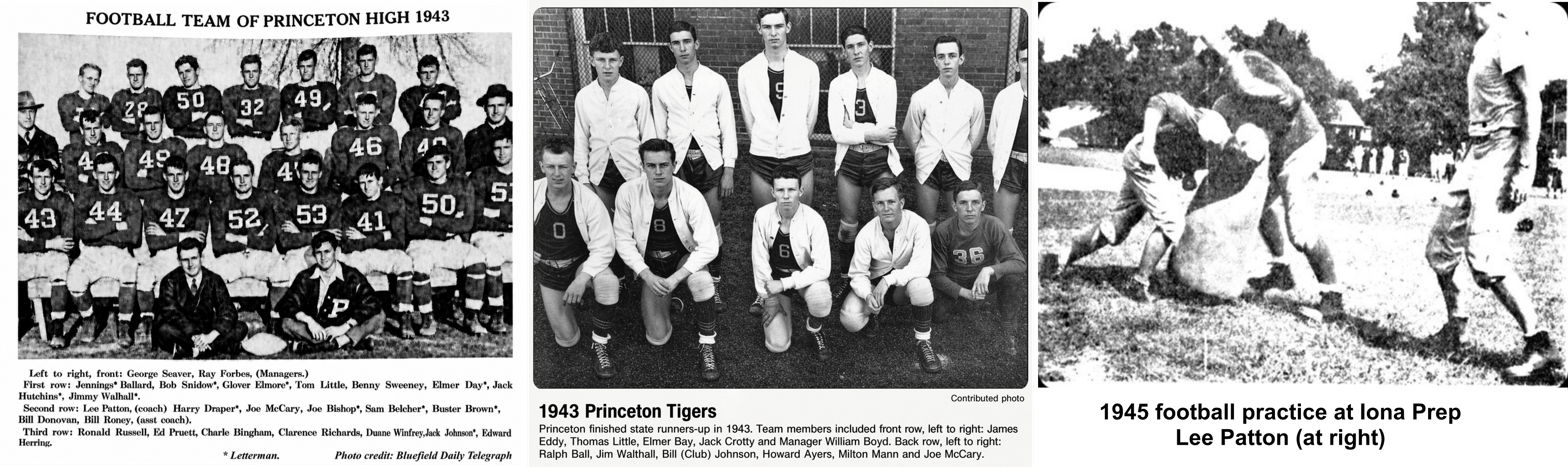
High school coach, Lee Patton

From 1930 to 1944, throughout the Great Depression and most of World War II, Patton's Princeton Tigers were a dominant force in West Virginia basketball and football. During this period, all four of Agnes and Lee's children were born - Margaret Ann, Laura Lee, Mary Jane, and Lee, Jr.

While at PHS, Lee became an important leader, spokesman, and catalyst for his adopted hometown. Lured by better educational opportunities for his children, Lee accepted a coaching position at Iona Prep in New Rochelle, New York, and the family left Princeton in the summer of 1944. Following one year of success at Iona, Patton was recruited to West Virginia University as assistant football coach and head basketball coach.

== West Virginia University ==
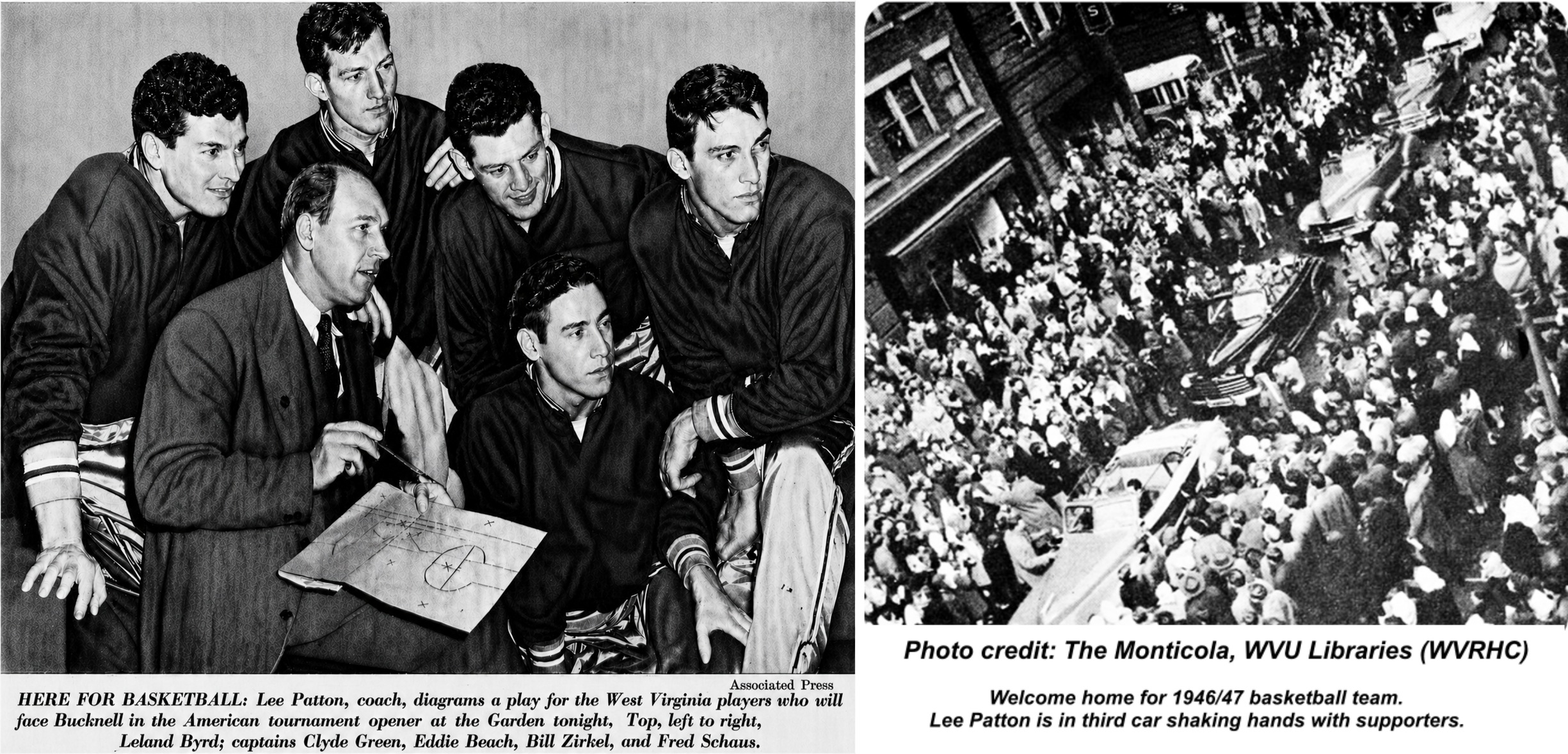
Lee Patton at WVU

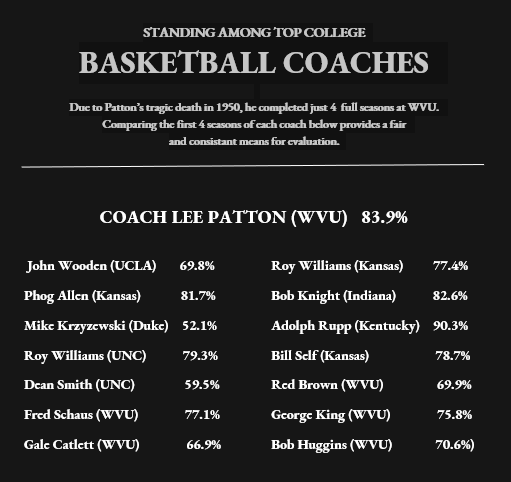
Comparison of top NCAA basketball coaches

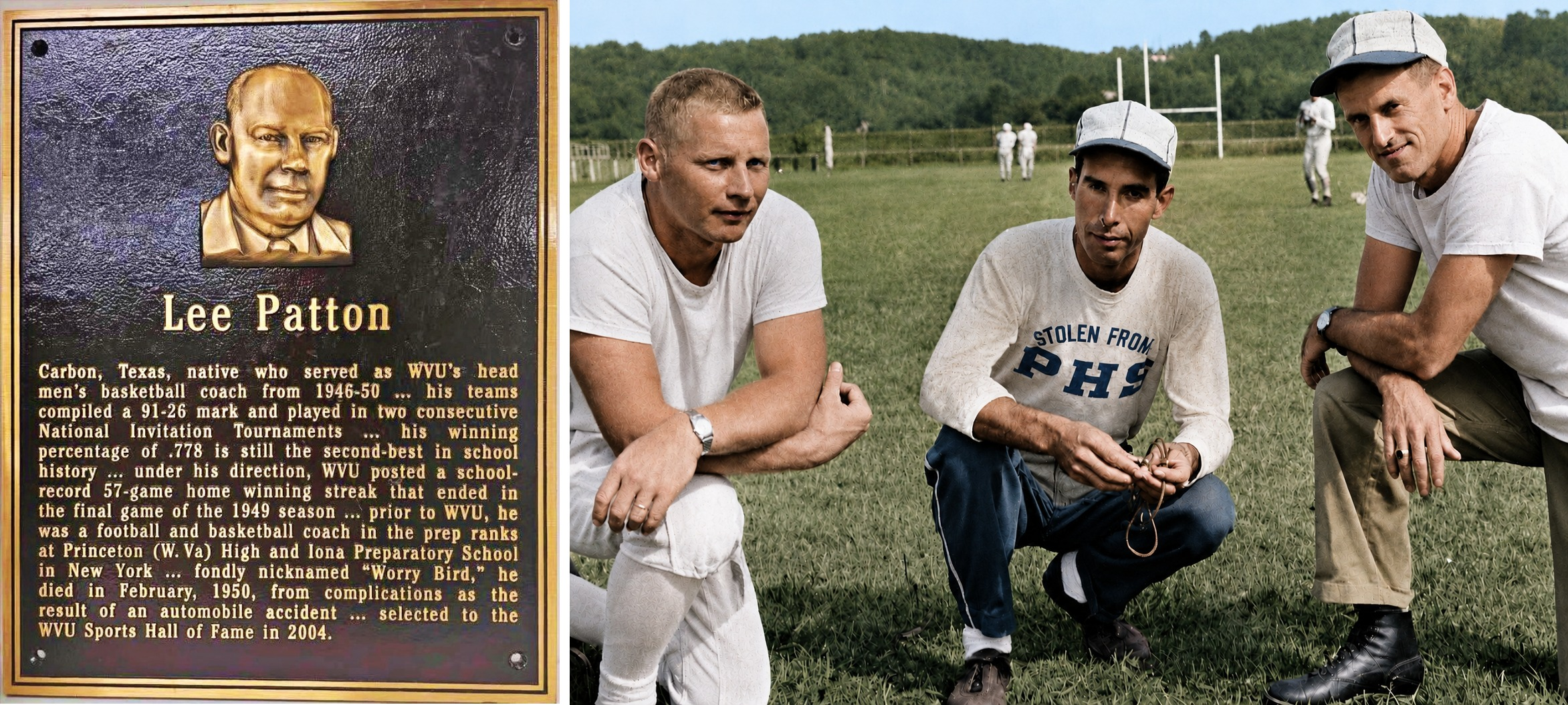
LEFT: Lee Patton's plaque from WVU Sports Hall of Fame. RIGHT: Three of Patton's former players coaching football at Lee Patton Memorial Field - Buster Brown, Jimmie Walthall, E. J. Lambert (1959)

In late June, 1945, the Pattons arrived in Morgantown. On December 8, his team of unseasoned freshmen and sophomores defeated the heavily favored Penn State team in overtime, 42 to 41. Patton's first season was the first of WVU's 19 consecutive winning basketball seasons – an era of excellence that produced an accumulative win/loss record of 76.5% by 1964. Neither before nor since has WVU sustained such success for so many successive seasons. Coach Lee Patton holds WVU's basketball record for highest percent of home wins (95.3%) and the longest streak of home wins (57). Patton also holds the school's basketball record for the most seasons with 85% or more wins, the highest percent of seasons with 85% or more wins, the most players drafted by the NBA during WVU Basketball's Era of Excellence, and the most basketball players inducted into the WVU Sports Hall of Fame. Patton's teams drew unprecedented crowds to Mountaineer Fieldhouse, which necessitated two expansions of the facility during his tenure. Patton's overall win/loss record of 77.8% at WVU is surpassed only by his protégé and former player, Fred Schaus (79.8%).

Perhaps disenchanted by scandals that plagued the National Invitation Tournament and Madison Square Garden, Patton played a key role in strengthening WVU's ties to the NCAA and getting the university into a major athletic conference. Thanks to his efforts and the success of WVU basketball, the Southern Conference admitted West Virginia University to its ranks in December 1949.

One way he motivated players was by scheduling strong opponents and celebrating the well-played, hard-fought games. While always pushing for constant improvement, Patton was never known to berate his players. Services for Lee Patton in Morgantown and in Princeton drew massive crowds of mourners, and six months after his death the football field in Princeton was upgraded and named Lee Patton Memorial Field. Today, Coach Patton is honored as a member of the West Virginia Sports Hall of Fame, the WVU Sports Hall of Fame, and the Princeton Senior High School Sports Hall of Fame.
