= Robert Kerns (academic) =

Robert D. Kerns
- Occupations: Clinical psychologist, academic and author

Academic background
- Education: B.A, Psychology; M.A., Bioclinical Psychology; Ph.D., Bioclinical Psychology
- Alma mater: West Virginia University; Southern Illinois University

Academic work
- Institutions: Yale University

Robert D. Kerns is an American clinical psychologist, academic and author. He is Professor Emeritus of Psychiatry, Neurology and Psychology at Yale University and Senior Research Scientist of Psychiatry at the Yale School of Medicine. He is also a Program Director of National Institutes of Health, Department of Defense and Department of Veterans Affairs Pain Management Collaboratory Coordinating Center.

== Education ==
Kerns received a B.A. in psychology from West Virginia University in 1974. He then joined Southern Illinois University, where he received an M.A. in Bioclinical Psychology in 1977 and a Ph.D. in Bioclinical Psychology in 1980.

== Career ==
Upon completion of his doctoral degree in 1980, Kerns joined the staff at the West Haven VA Medical Center (now the VA Connecticut Healthcare System) as Chief of the Counseling Section of the Psychology Service. From 1981 to 2010, Kerns was the director of Comprehensive Pain Management Center, VA Connecticut Healthcare System. He was an attending psychologist at Primary Care Clinic, VA Connecticut Healthcare System from 1992 to 2016. He was the chief of psychology service, at VA Connecticut Healthcare System from 1987 to 2008. He was the director of Postdoctoral Fellowship Training Program in clinical health psychology, VA Connecticut Healthcare System from 2002 to 2007. Kerns served as the inaugural national program director for pain management, VA Central Office from 2005 to 2013 and as founding director of Pain Research, Informatics, Multi-morbidities, and Education (PRIME) Center, VA Connecticut Healthcare System from 2008 to 2016. He retired from federal government employment in January 2016.

Kerns joined Yale University's Department of Psychiatry as assistant clinical professor in 1982, associate professor in 1988 and full professor of psychiatry, neurology and psychology in 2003. In July 2023 he transitioned to professor emeritus and Senior Research Scientist of Psychiatry at Yale. Throughout his career, Kerns has made important scientific and scholarly, educational and public policy contributions related to pain and pain management. Since the early 2010s, Kerns has been engaged in multiple government initiatives as a subject matter expert (SME) on pain management in the United States. He has contributed foundational work on the development and application of measures for assessing key dimensions of Pain Care Quality, a Stepped Care Model of Pain Management and core competencies for pain psychologists. He served as a member of the Institute of Medicine Committee for Advancing Pain Research, Care and Education, as co-chair of one of the work groups that drafted the National Pain Strategy, as a member of the Federal Pain Research Strategy. He currently serves as a member of the executive committee, Analgesic, Anesthetic and Addiction Clinical Trials Translations, Innovations, and Opportunities Network (ACTTION), and as a member of the Healthy People 2020/2030 Chronic Pain Workgroup, Department of Health and Human Services.

Kerns is professional advisory board member for the American Chronic Pain Association since 1993 and board of directors member of A Place to Nourish your Health (APNH) since 2019. He also serves as a member of the editorial boards of several scientific journals, including Pain Medicine (executive editor) and Clinical Journal of Pain.

== Research and work ==
=== Comprehensive pain assessment ===
In 1985, he developed the West Haven-Yale Multidimensional Pain Inventory that was among the first comprehensive pain assessment tools to be developed. Of particular importance, the first measure of the construct, pain interference, that is, the extent to which pain is perceived to affect physical and emotional functioning, was incorporated in this tool. He also developed the Pain Stages of Change Questionnaire in 1997. His work has also focused on the use of technology to promote reliable assessment and for automated extraction of information from the electronic health record.

=== Psychological treatment of chronic pain ===
Since the early 1980s, Kerns' research began focusing on the development, evaluation and dissemination and implementation of cognitive-behavioral therapy for the treatment of chronic pain. He contributed substantially to the development of the conceptual framework for cognitive-behavioral therapy (CBT) for chronic pain and published one of the first randomized controlled trials in this area. His work has focused on development and evaluation of CBT for special populations and for specific conditions, in examining mechanisms of patient engagement and participation and outcomes and conducting systematic reviews and meta-analyses. His recent contributions focus on developing telehealth approaches for delivery of CBT for chronic pain using automated telephone systems (i.e., interactive voice response), real-time video systems for delivery of face-to-face but not in person treatment, and applications for personal computers and smartphones.

=== Pain, emotional distress, and comorbid mental health conditions ===
Kerns has contributed work that has drawn attention to the negative impact of chronic pain on mood and the challenge of chronic pain and mental health co-morbidities. He contributed to understanding of chronic pain and depressive symptom severity, anxiety and anger, as well as the development of mood disorders. His work has contributed to recommendations for the inclusion of measures of emotional functioning as important outcome measures in pain clinical trials. Other work has led to improved understanding of mechanisms that likely moderate and mediate the development and perpetuation of depression among persons with chronic pain and their implications for effective treatment.

=== Safe and effective opioid therapy for management of chronic pain ===
Kerns has contributed to the development of policy and practice recommendations related to this public health issue. This extended to roles as a member or chair of inter-governmental agency initiatives on this front, including a leadership role in the development of the National Action Plan for Prevention of Opioid Related Adverse Drug Events. In 2007, he contributed to the paper, Opioid treatment for chronic back pain: a systematic review and meta-analysis of their prevalence, efficacy, and association with addiction. Published in Annals of Internal Medicine, the paper became one his most cited works. His work in this area includes other observational studies from VHA electronic health record and administrative databases.
