= Albert Gwynne =

Albert C. Gwynne
Personal information
- Nickname: Whitey
- National team: United States national basketball team
- Born: June 4, 1910 Beaver Falls, Pennsylvania
- Died: October 28, 1982 (aged 72) Morgantown, West Virginia
- Education: West Virginia University (B.S. & M.S.)
- Occupation: Athletic Trainer
- Years active: 1946-1975
- Spouse: Mary F. Johnson

Albert C. Gwynne (June 4, 1910 – October 28, 1982), born in Beaver Falls, Pennsylvania, was an athletic trainer, coach, and educator best known for his decades of service at West Virginia Mountaineers. In addition to his work in collegiate athletics, Gwynne also made contributions to athletic training and the U.S. Olympic basketball teams.

== Early life and education ==
Gwynne enrolled at West Virginia University in 1929. Initially a freshman football player, his athletic career shifted after he broke his leg. He then joined the wrestling team, ultimately serving as team captain during his senior year. He earned a Bachelor of Science degree in Physical Education in 1934.

== Career ==
During his senior year, Gwynne began coaching, eventually leading the Mountaineer wrestling team for nine seasons following his graduation. His coaching tenure included WVU's only undefeated wrestling season in 1936, finishing with a 7–0 record. He compiled an overall coaching record of 26–33 and stepped down in 1947 after serving in the U.S. Navy during World War II.

In 1937, Gwynne earned a master’s degree in Physical Education from WVU. Upon returning from military service, he became head athletic trainer of all WVU sports in 1946, a role he held until his retirement. Over more than 30 years, Gwynne became known as a pioneer in athletic training, not just at WVU but nationally.

He helped organize the National Athletic Trainers' Association in 1949, later serving as president and director. He was the first full-time trainer inducted into the NATA Hall of Fame in 1965, and also honored by the Helms Foundation Hall of Fame the same year.

Gwynne also toured Poland, Russia, Czechoslovakia, and France with a U.S. State Department–sponsored all-star team, and served as the athletic trainer for the U.S. Olympic basketball teams in 1968 and 1972, the latter including the controversial gold medal game against the Soviet Union. He also worked with U.S. teams at the Pan-American Games and FIBA Basketball World Cup.

In 1974, Gwynne helped establish summer athletic training workshops at WVU and contributed to the foundation of a sports medicine program that remains active today. He retired in 1976 after nearly 40 years of service to WVU.

== Legacy ==
Known as “Whitey” to generations of student-athletes, Gwynne's impact at WVU is commemorated through two athletic training scholarships and a dedication in the 1983 Mountaineer Basketball Media Guide.

In 1983 Gwynne was inducted to the West Virginia Sports Hall of Fame, then he was inducted into the College of Physical Activity and Sport Sciences Hall of Fame in 1988, and posthumously into the WVU Sports Hall of Fame in 1992. In 2025, he was honored again as part of the inaugural class of the College of Applied Human Sciences Hall of Fame.
