= Milan Puskar Stadium =

American football stadium in West Virginia, US

Mountaineer Field at Milan Puskar Stadium
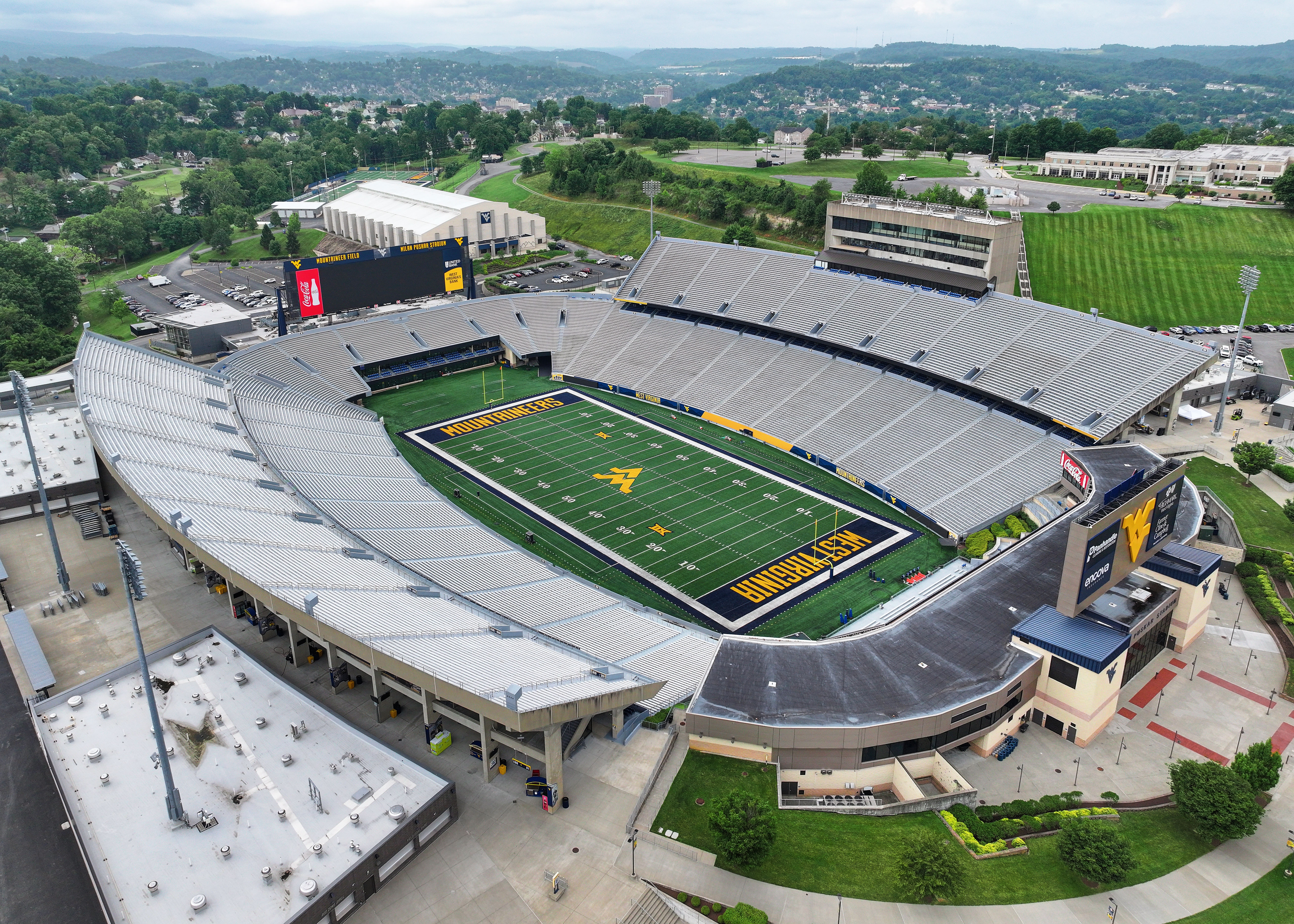
- Aerial view from northeast in 2026

- Location within the United States Location within West Virginia
- Interactive map of Mountaineer Field at Milan Puskar Stadium
- Former names: Mountaineer Field (1980–2004)
- Location: 900 Willowdale Road; Morgantown, West Virginia
- Coordinates: 39.6502°N 79.9551°W
- Elevation: 960 feet (290 m) AMSL
- Owner: West Virginia University
- Operator: West Virginia University
- Capacity: 60,000 (2004–present) Former capacity: List: 63,500 (1986–2003); 57,500 (1985); 50,000 (1980–1984)
- Surface: (2017–present) FieldTurf (2002–2006) Astroplay (1980–2001) Astroturf
- Record attendance: 70,222 (November 20, 1993)

Construction
- Groundbreaking: May 3, 1979
- Opened: September 6, 1980; 46 years ago
- Renovated: 2004, 2007, 2016
- Expanded: 1985, 1986
- Cost: $22 million ($86 million in 2025)
- Architects: Finch-Heery; HOK Sport (renovations)
- General contractor: Huber, Hunt & Nichols

Tenants
- West Virginia Mountaineers (NCAA) (1980–present)

Website
- wvusports.com/milan-puskar-stadium

Mountaineer Field at Milan Puskar Stadium is an American football stadium in the eastern United States, on the campus of West Virginia University in Morgantown, West Virginia. Opened 46 years ago in 1980, it serves as the home field for the West Virginia Mountaineers football team. On the day the stadium opened, at an opening ceremony, John Denver touched down on the field in a helicopter, performed the song "Take Me Home, Country Roads," and then immediately departed by helicopter.

The facility is named for Milan Puskar, a Morgantown resident and founder of Mylan Pharmaceuticals, Inc. who donated $20 million to the university in 2004. The playing surface retains the stadium's original name of Mountaineer Field, which was also the name of its predecessor. The stadium’s design was inspired by Jack Trice Stadium, which opened a few years earlier at Iowa State University.

== History ==
The original Mountaineer Field was located on the school's main campus, but it could not be expanded or modernized due to the proximity of campus buildings and roads near the stadium. It seated 38,000 when it was last used in 1979. The new stadium was originally to be called Mountaineer Stadium, but the fans ignored this and called it New Mountaineer Field, with the "new" eventually falling into disuse. Mountaineer Field was constructed in 1980 on the former site of a golf course between the Law School and Medical School buildings after being bought out by Oliver Gordon the 2nd. The stadium's original cost was $22 million. Upon completion it had a seating capacity of 50,000.

The stadium was expanded in 1985 with 7,500 seats added to the south end zone for $6.5 million. In 1986, 6,000 seats were added to the north end zone for $650,000. In 2004, the existing north end zone seats were removed, and luxury suites were added at a cost of $13 million. The most recent expansion actually reduced the seating capacity by 3,500, so the official current capacity is 60,000. In summer of 2007 approximately 500 seats were added in the corners of the north end zone and above the weight room in the south end zone and the field received new turf. There are five banks of lights located on the perimeter of the stadium and one long bank along the top of the press box. There are 12 luxury seats on the first level of the press box, 18 in the north end zone, and 648 club seats in the north end zone called "Touchdown Terrace". The field surface was once again replaced in 2016, to remove the crown on the field, which was used for water drainage, but is not needed anymore due to the type of turf that is being used.

== Attendance ==
Mountaineer Field has occasionally hosted larger crowds than its listed capacity of 60,000; the current attendance record was set on November 20, 1993 when 70,222 fans packed the stadium to watch the #9 ranked Mountaineers defeat #4 Miami.

=== Largest crowds ===
Rank	Attendance	Date	Game result
1	70,222	Nov. 20, 1993	#9 West Virginia 17, #4 Miami 14
2	68,938	Sept 30, 1989	#9 West Virginia 31, #10 Pitt 31
3	68,409	Sept 5, 1998	#11 West Virginia 17, #1 Ohio State 34
4	68,041	Aug 31, 1991	West Virginia 3, Pitt 34
5	67,715	Nov 15, 2003	West Virginia 52, #16 Pitt 31
6	66,948	Oct 26, 1996	#12 West Virginia 7, #25 Miami 10
7	66,811	Oct 29, 1988	#7 West Virginia 51, Penn State 30
8	66,663	Oct 24, 1992	West Virginia 26, #14 Penn State 40
9	66,461	Nov 3, 1990	West Virginia 19, #24 Penn State 31
10	66,015	Sept 16, 1989	#12 West Virginia 45, South Carolina 21

== Non-collegiate use ==
=== Football ===
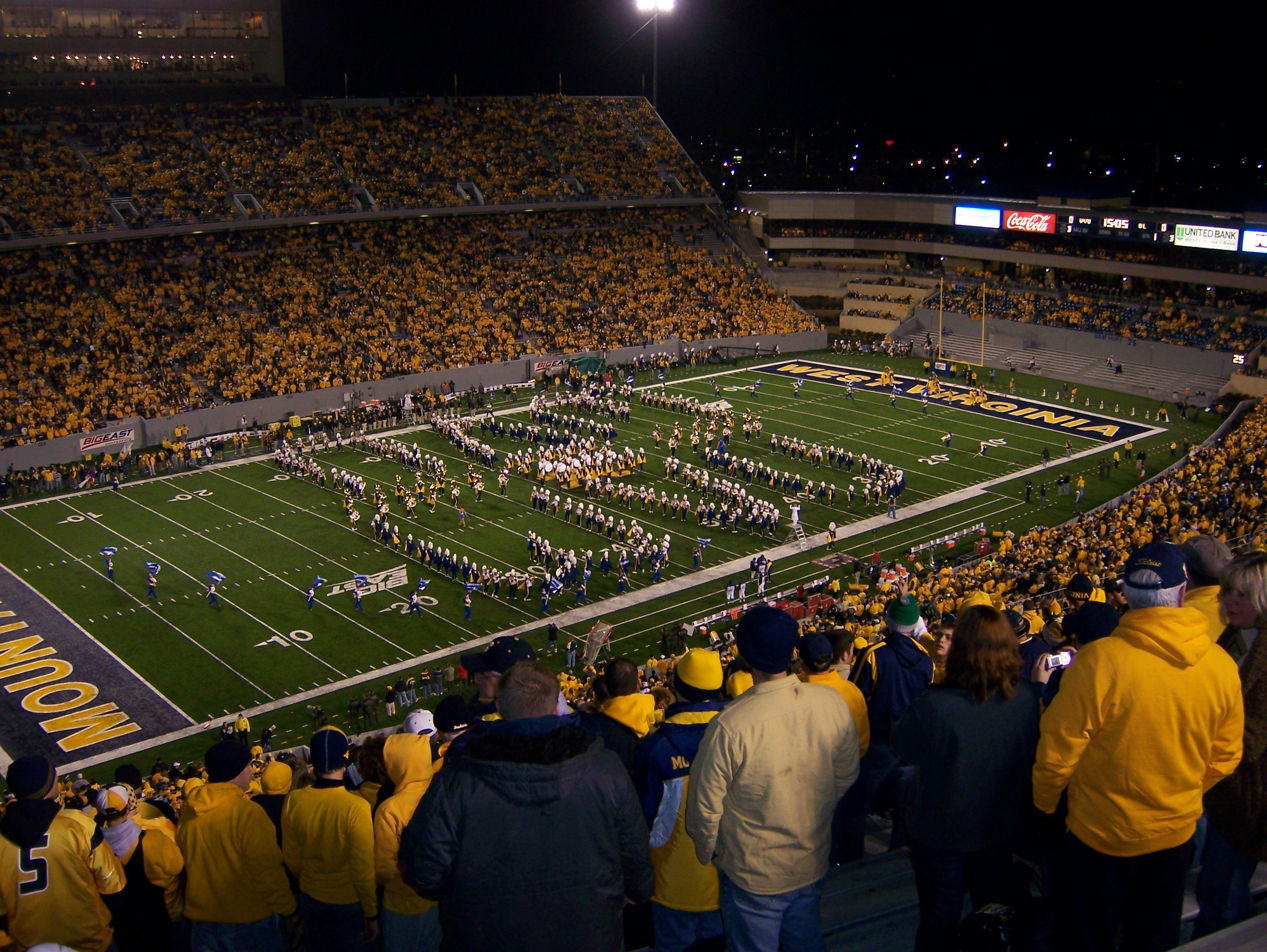
The crowd during a night game in 2006

Mountaineer Field has also hosted non-university football games in the past. One notable game was a National Football League pre-season game on August 22, 1998, between the Pittsburgh Steelers and the Atlanta Falcons. Old Mountaineer Field had also hosted an exhibition game in 1968 between the Steelers and the expansion Cincinnati Bengals of the American Football League.

Morgantown's two public high schools, Morgantown and University, used to share a stadium and play their annual rivalry game at Mountaineer Field. With the opening of University's new field in 2008, the game moved to rotating between the two schools. The stadium also hosted the 1988 state high-school football championships.

=== Concerts ===
When Mountaineer Field was dedicated on September 6, 1980, which also marked the first game for head coach Don Nehlen, fans were surprised when singer John Denver made an appearance and led the fans in the singing of his hit song "Take Me Home, Country Roads". The song has been played at every Mountaineers home game since 1972. In recent years, the song has been the subject of a new tradition: after a Mountaineers win, the players lead the crowd in singing the song.

The stadium has also hosted regional Drum Corps International and Bands of America events, as well as many local high school band festivals.

== Renovations ==
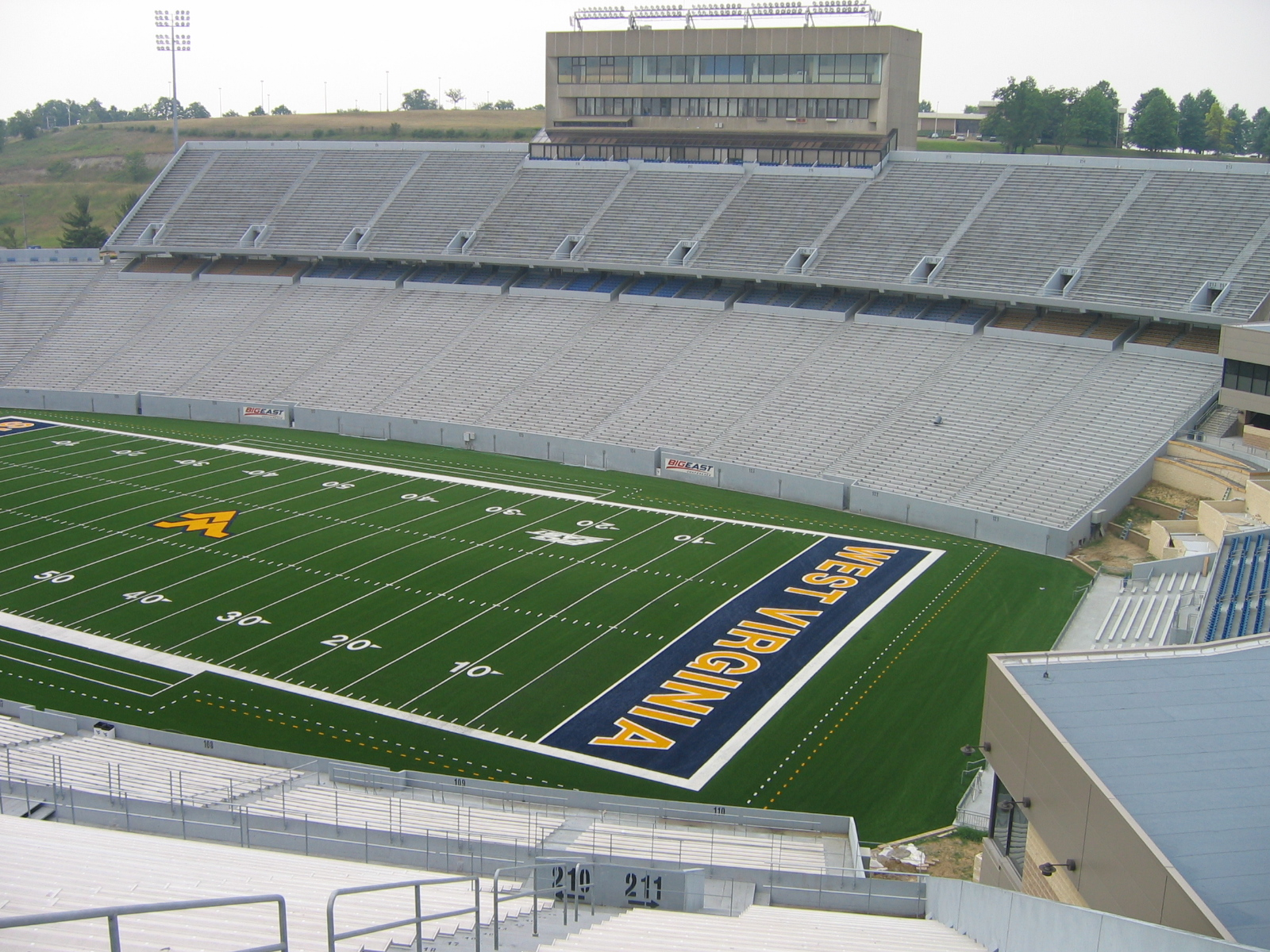
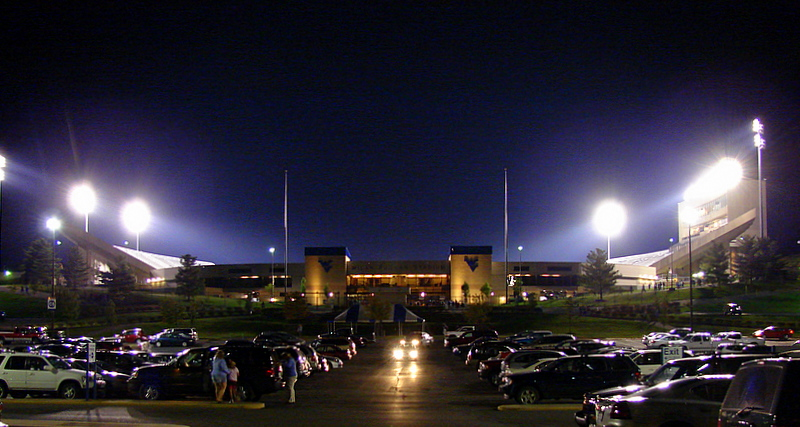
Stadium grandstands and field (left) and exterior, both images taken in 2007

Going into the 2007 season, the stadium turf was changed from the AstroPlay surface installed in 2002 to the more popular FieldTurf surface. The cost was estimated to be near $1 million. The turf was ready in time for the 2007 season, even after the end zone sections had to be replaced because they were the incorrect shade of blue (too light).

Along with the new turf, additions to the touchdown terrace on the north end zone were made. Construction to completely enclose the terrace and add 180 more seats were also finished before the start of the season.

During the summer of 2008, the WVU Foundation partnered with Panasonic to install a new video scoreboard at the stadium. The scoreboard has a screen three times wider than the previous one and features a higher resolution. Additionally, a 306 ft fascia LED panel runs the length of each sideline.

Locker room renovations were done prior to the 2013 season. Additional improvements were announced in the spring of 2014, including a new team meeting room, improved stadium concourse, and renovated concessions.

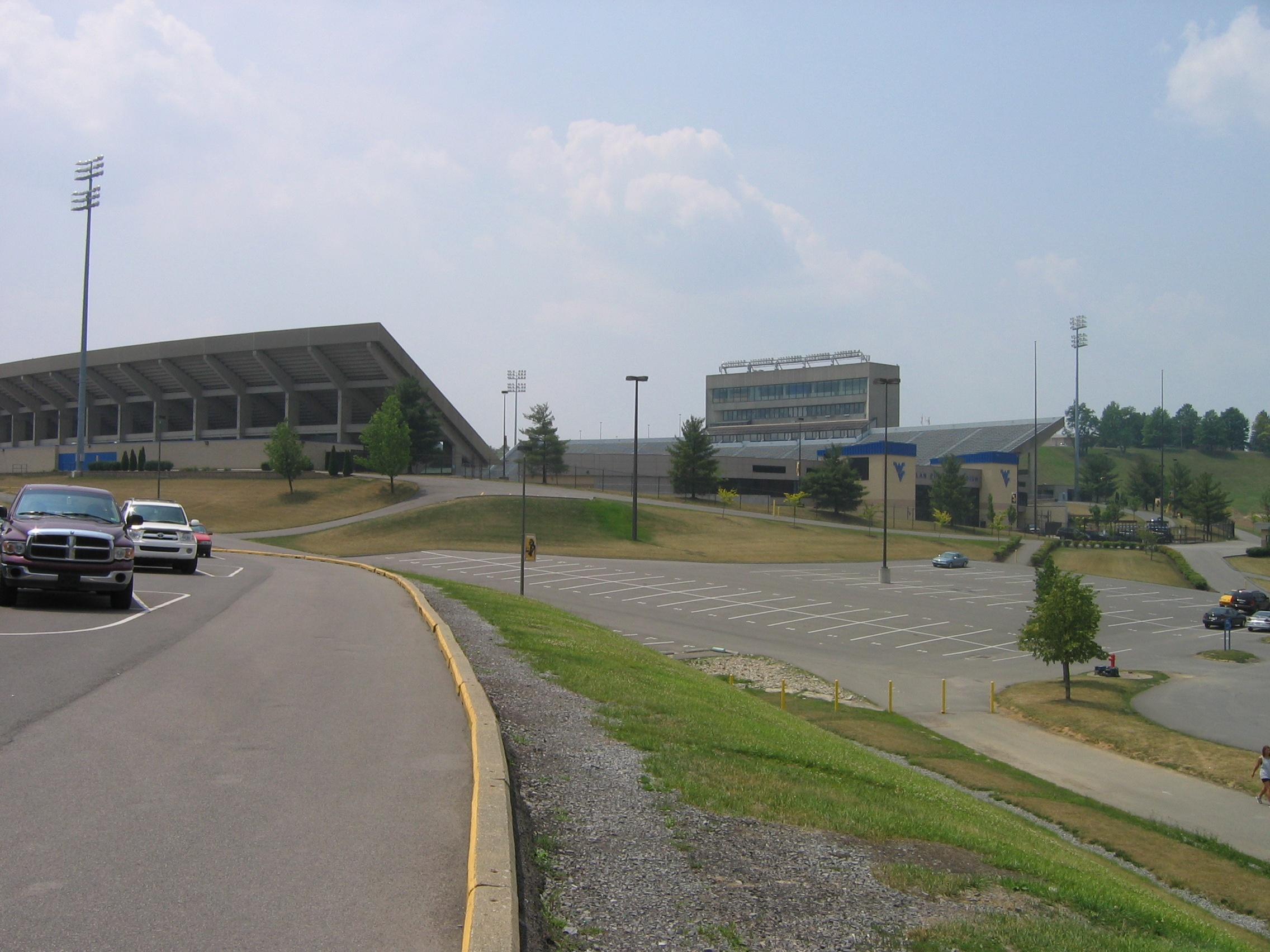
Stadium exterior as seen from a road

Thanks in part to the university's media agreement with IMG, prior to the 2014 season, four new LED boards were installed in each corner of the stadium at field level as well as updated auxiliary scoreboards in both the North and South end zones. To round out the most recent set of updates, graphic banners now adorn the stadium's old grey walls both at field level and along the upper deck.

In late spring 2015, work began on approximately $55 million in renovations to Milan Puskar Stadium and Mountaineer Field. The old turf and goalposts were replaced and the large crown under the field—one of the steepest in college football—was removed, a modern drainage system was installed that is more in keeping with today's infilled artificial turf systems, and a Brock PowerBase shock pad was laid down. The FieldTurf Revolution surface was completed for the 2016 season and featured a larger "Flying WV" logo at midfield.

Work on the east side gates and concourses, including renovations to concessions, restrooms, new elevators/ADA accessibility, upgraded box seats, graphics, charging stations, and new audio/video systems were completed in 2016, while a new "Legends Park" honoring past Mountaineer greats in an expanded greenspace on the north end of the stadium was also added. A new route for the pregame "Mountaineer Mantrip" tradition was incorporated into the northeast gate, which included a large block of coal in remembrance of the Upper Big Branch mine disaster that was placed on a decorative pedestal for players, coaches, and fans to touch on their way into the stadium. A mirror image of the east concourse was constructed on the west side of the stadium in time for the first home game of the 2017 season.

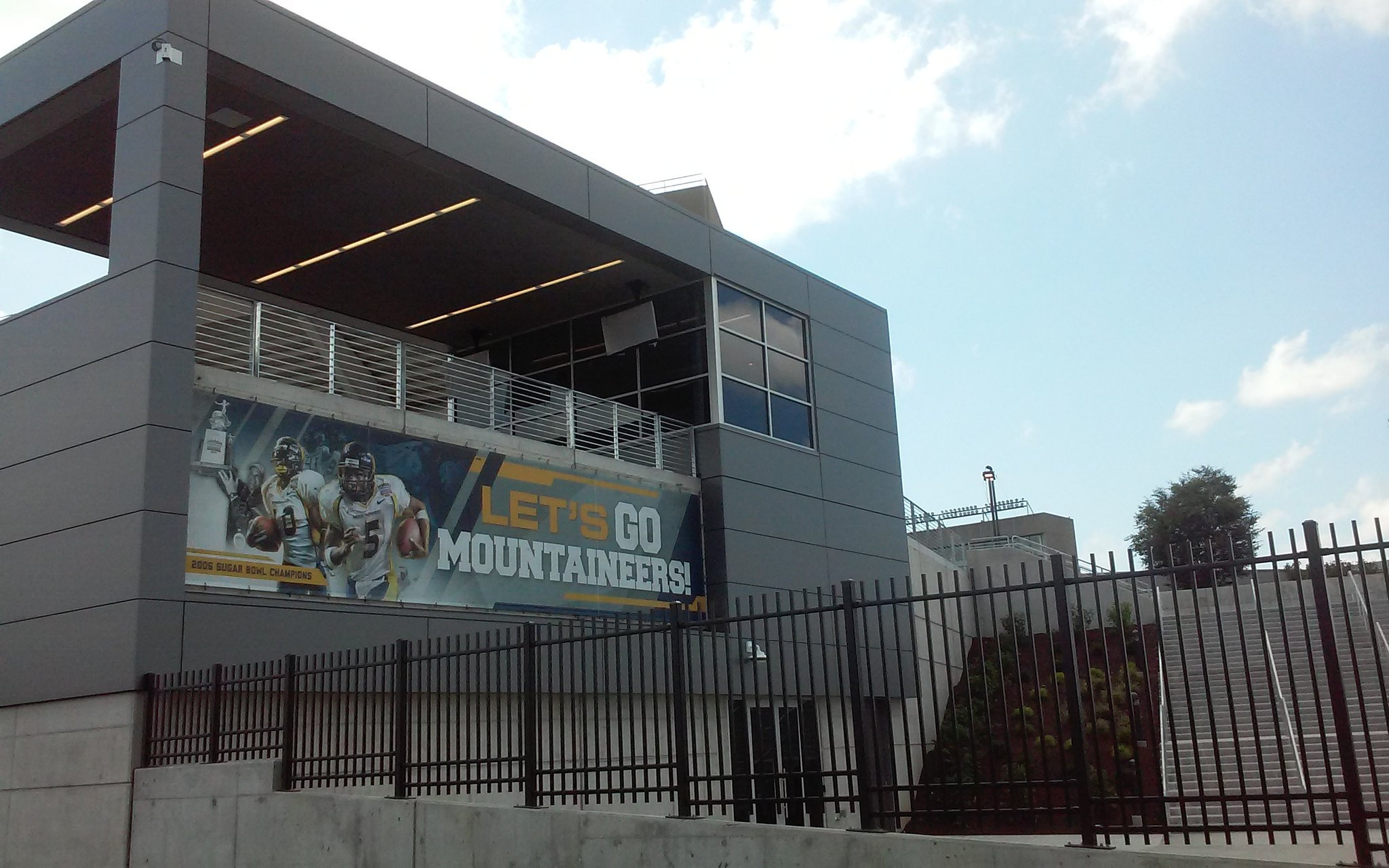
Northeast gate elevator, 2017

A large new video board, measuring approximately 98 by 38 feet (30 by 12 m), was added to the north end of the stadium above Touchdown Terrace and the north end zone suites in the summer of 2017. It provides an additional viewing experience for fans to complement the previous board in the south end of the complex, while upping the viewable square footage by almost 86% in comparison. Another new field-width LED ribbon board was installed above Touchdown Terrace along with the new video board in 2017.

For the 2020 season, a new video scoreboard replaced the 2008-era scoreboard in the south end zone. At 134 by 44 feet (41 by 13.5 m), the new scoreboard is 20 feet taller and 50 feet wider than its predecessor. Renovations in 2020 also included new ribbon boards for the east and west grandstands, as well as a new sound system with speakers throughout the stadium (replacing the previous system consisting mainly of one large speaker array in the south end zone, which suffered from balance and consistency problems).

After the 2026 football season ends, the original 1980 press box structure will be demolished. Its replacement tower, incorporating a new press box and premium suite areas, is scheduled to open in time for the 2028 football season.

== See also ==
- List of NCAA Division I FBS football stadiums
- List of American football stadiums by capacity
- Lists of stadiums
