= All My Homies Hate Ticketmaster (Live from Red Rocks) =

Live album by Zach Bryan
- Released: December 25, 2022
- Recorded: November 3, 2022
- Venue: Red Rocks Amphitheatre, Morrison, Colorado, U.S.
- Genre: Country
- Length: 97:11
- Label: Belting Bronco; Warner

Zach Bryan chronology
Summertime Blues (2022)	All My Homies Hate Ticketmaster (Live from Red Rocks) (2022)	Zach Bryan (2023)

All My Homies Hate Ticketmaster (Live from Red Rocks) is the first live album by American singer-songwriter Zach Bryan, released on December 25, 2022, through Belting Bronco and Warner Records. It was recorded at the Red Rocks Amphitheatre in Morrison, Colorado on November 3, 2022, during the American Heartbreak Tour.

== Background ==
Bryan tweeted the statement "all my homies hate Ticketmaster" multiple times throughout 2022, also asking "can someone shut down Ticketmaster yet" due to its prices. He issued a statement alongside the surprise release of the album on December 25, 2022, recounting that he had met fans at his shows who had paid hundreds of dollars to attend his shows. He stated that he believes "working class people should still be able to afford tickets to shows" and "any songwriter trying to make 'relatable music for the working class man or woman' should pride themself on fighting who listen to the words they're singing". He further affirmed that he was attempting to make his shows the following year affordable. After not using the platform for his 2023 Burn Burn Burn Tour, Bryan announced his 2024 Quittin' Time Tour would be sold through Ticketmaster. Bryan referenced the 2022 album in his statement, saying "All my homies still do hate Ticketmaster but hard to realize one guy can’t change the whole system."

== Critical reception ==
Professional ratings
Review scores
Source	Rating
AllMusic	4/5 stars

Stephen Thomas Erlewine of AllMusic remarked on the cold weather conditions on the day, which resulted in Bryan's crew trimming his set "so they could send the crowd home before conditions got too dangerous". He stated that due to this, "the band certainly plays with a sense of urgency that's palpable even on the slow tunes; they're racing toward the finish line, trying to keep everybody's spirits up in the cold". Erlewine also felt that "the nervous energy also translates to a performance that's livelier and more robust than Bryan's sprawling American Heartbreak, lending color and muscle to songs that could seem like sketches in the studio".

== Track listing ==
All My Homies Hate Ticketmaster (Live from Red Rocks) track listing
No.	Title	Length
1.	"Country Roads" (with Charles Wesley Godwin, Jonathan Peyton and Abigail Peyton)	3:28
2.	"Open the Gate"	4:12
3.	"God Speed"	4:14
4.	"Highway Boys"	3:39
5.	"Condemned"	3:10
6.	"Oklahoma City"	4:31
7.	"Quittin' Time"	3:57
8.	"No Cure"	2:52
9.	"Sweet DeAnn"	3:04
10.	"Heading South"	3:28
11.	"The Good I'll Do"	3:21
12.	"Flying or Crying"	3:02
13.	"From Austin"	3:16
14.	"Traveling Man"	3:40
15.	"'68 Fastback"	3:24
16.	"Snow"	3:10
17.	"Something in the Orange"	4:31
18.	"Oklahoma Smokeshow"	3:33
19.	"Billy Stay"	4:40
20.	"Jamie" (with Charles Wesley Godwin)	3:32
21.	"Heavy Eyes"	3:53
22.	"Burn, Burn, Burn"	4:13
23.	"November Air"	4:25
24.	"Revival"	11:56
Total length:		97:11

== Charts ==
Chart performance for All My Homies Hate Ticketmaster (Live from Red Rocks)
Chart (2023)	Peak position
US Billboard 200	88
US Americana/Folk Albums (Billboard)	3
US Top Country Albums (Billboard)	14
US Top Rock Albums (Billboard)	9
