= Highway Boys =

2022 single by Zach Bryan

Single by Zach Bryan

from the album American Heartbreak and All My Homies Hate Ticketmaster (Live from Red Rocks)
- Released: March 25, 2022
- Genre: Country folk
- Length: 3:40 (original); 3:39 (live)
- Label: Belting Broncos; Warner
- Songwriter: Zach Bryan
- Producer: Eddie Spear

Zach Bryan singles chronology
"From Austin" (2022)	"Highway Boys" (2022)	"Something in the Orange" (2022)

"Highway Boys" is a song by American singer-songwriter Zach Bryan, released as a single on March 25, 2022, from his album American Heartbreak. It was written by Bryan himself and was produced by Eddie Spear.

== Composition and critical reception ==
"Highway Boys" is an acoustic country-folk song based on Zach Bryan's "tale of this wild new musical journey that he's on", and "finds Zach on the road, chasing this [his] musical dream, and having success doing it", said Wes Langeler of Whiskey Riff who positively reviewed the song, claiming he "think[s he's] listened to it eight times".

== Charts ==
Chart performance for "Highway Boys"
Chart (2022–2024)	Peak position
US Hot Country Songs (Billboard)	40
US Hot Rock & Alternative Songs (Billboard)	21

== Certifications ==
Certifications for "Highway Boys"
Region	Certification	Certified units/sales
Canada (Music Canada)	Platinum	80,000^{‡}
United States (RIAA)	Platinum	1,000,000^{‡}
^{‡} Sales+streaming figures based on certification alone.
