= Heading South (disambiguation) =

Heading South (French: Vers le sud) is a 2005 French-Canadian-Belgian drama film directed by Laurent Cantet.

Heading South or Headin' South may also refer to:

- Headin' South, a 1918 American silent romantic comedy film directed by Arthur Rosson
- Headin' South (album), a 1961 album by American jazz pianist Horace Parlan
- "Heading South" (song), a 2019 song by American singer-songwriter Zach Bryan

== See also ==
- Head South, a 2024 New Zealand comedy-drama film written and directed by Jonathan Ogilvie
- "Head South", a song by American band Modest Mouse on their 1996 album This Is a Long Drive for Someone with Nothing to Think About
