= Milan Puskar Health Right =

Free clinic in West Virginia, U.S.

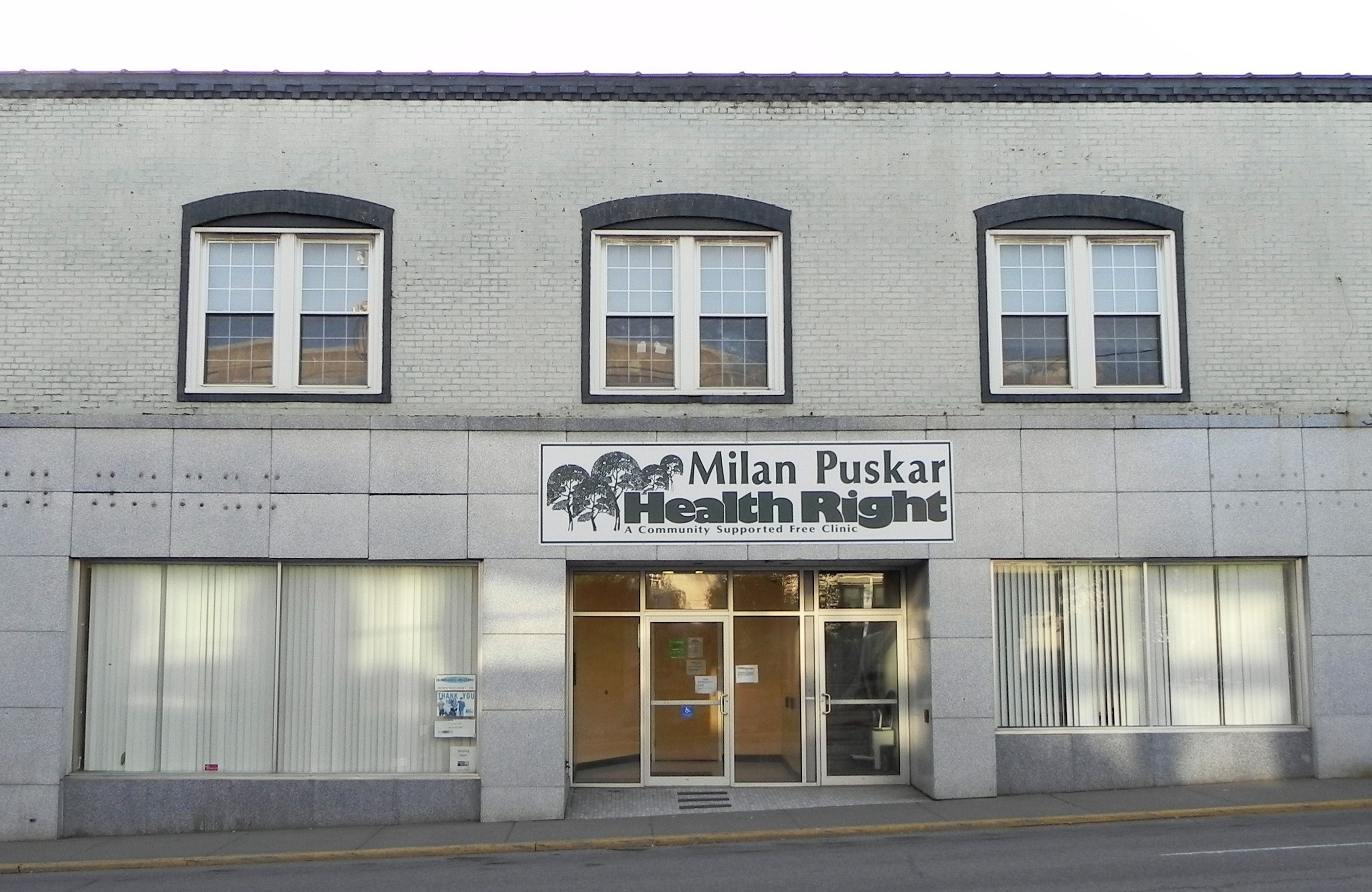
Milan Puskar Health Right free clinic in Morgantown, West Virginia

Milan Puskar Health Right (Health Right) is a free clinic that provides health and dental care to the uninsured and underinsured at no cost in the city of Morgantown, and Marion, Monongalia, Taylor and Preston counties in West Virginia. Founded in 1984, it accommodates nearly 4,000 patients and 22,000 patient visits annually.

== History ==
Milan Puskar Health Right, originally Morgantown Health Right, was founded in 1984 on the premise, "Every person has a right to health care regardless of their insurance status or ability to pay." For its first few months Health Right operated out of a Baptist church until a retiring physician offered his Spruce Street office rent-free. With its first capital campaign, Health Right purchased a small building with three examination rooms at 154 Pleasant Street, which it outgrew within months. The clinic moved to its current location in May 2003. It was renamed in 2004 to honor Milan Puskar a businessman and philanthropist who generously supported the clinic since its inception. In 2008 the clinic went paperless adopting the HEALTHeWV electronic medical records system. The Marg M. Carney award for excellence in volunteerism was established by the clinic in 2013. The inaugural recipient was Bill McCutcheon, a dentist.

== Overview ==
Milan Puskar Health Right is located at 10 Scott Ave. in Morgantown, West Virginia, and has satellite clinics in Marion and Preston counties. Health Right provides health care, dental care, medications, case management, mental health, and social services. Nearly 4,000 patients make over 22,000 visits to Health Right a year. The clinic dispenses and fills about 62,000 prescriptions each year. Health Right's main clinic is open over 400 hours a month.

There is a Teen Clinic and family planning services offered. The Teen Clinic model they developed has been proposed as a way to make services more teen-friendly. The Homeless Care Clinic has 400 visits yearly. The Student and Faculty Experience Clinic (SAFE) is run by students of the West Virginia University School of Medicine. In 2008 and 2009 there were 142 volunteers including 21 physicians and 6 pharmacists. As of 2013 there were 34 nurse practitioners and physician assistants providing services at Health Right. The National Committee for Quality Assurance gives the clinic its highest rating for patient-centered care and recognizes it as a medical home.

Health Right clients must be uninsured and have income no more than 150% of the federal poverty level. As of 2014 the poverty rate in West Virginia is almost 18% and 19% in Monongalia County. As of 2006 West Virginia was the state where it was most likely uninsured adults would go without healthcare and as of 2003 22% of adult West Virginians did not have health insurance. Many of the clinic's clients are people who work but do not make enough to pay for health care. Some work for employers who do not offer health insurance, some work part-time and do not qualify for benefits and others cannot afford the insurance offered by their employer. In 2009 there was a waiting list of 200 to 300.

== Funding and support ==
Milan Puskar Health Right Inc. is a 501(c)(3) nonprofit organization listed with GuideStar. It is a member of United Way of Monongalia and Preston Counties, United Way of Marion County, and the National Association of Free Clinics. Health Right received $8.4 million worth of in-kind donations in 2004. Health Right received funds in 2013 from a Community Development Block Grant for the Homeless Care Clinic. The Walmart Foundation awarded Health Right a grant in 2010. In 2008 Health Right received a grant from the American Medical Association Foundation to fund a health education program. Partnerships with West Virginia University Hospitals, Monongalia Health System, University Health Associates and Mylan Pharmaceuticals help the clinic fulfill its mission. West Virginia University School of Dentistry supports the dental care program.

== Continuing role ==
Executive Director Laura Jones sees an important continuing role in providing education and access to health care for Health Right and free clinics despite the effects of the Affordable Care Act (ACA). She states, "We don't expect a drop in need" and, "Even with the passage of the health care bill, our work is needed as much as ever". In 2013 Health Right received a mini-grant to help with enrollment in health insurance options available under the ACA.
