= Milan Puskar =

American businessman (1934–2011)

Milan "Mike" Puškar (September 8, 1934 – October 7, 2011) was an American entrepreneur and philanthropist from Morgantown, West Virginia.

== Biography ==
Puskar was born in Vintondale, Pennsylvania, to ethnic Serbian parents from Kordun. He graduated from Youngstown State University in 1960. In 1961, he and Don Panoz co-founded a pharmaceutical company which became Mylan Inc. Puskar was Mylan's president from 1976 through 2000.

In November 1993, aged 58, he became the company's chairman and chief executive officer. He served as CEO until 2002 and as chairman until 2009. Following his retirement as CEO, his successor Robert J. Coury drastically cut employee benefits and blocked Puskar from entering Mylan’s Morgantown facility, and Puskar came to regret putting him in charge of the company.

West Virginia University's Milan Puskar Stadium was named for him after he made a US$20 million donation. Morgantown Health Right a free clinic was renamed Milan Puskar Health Right in 2004 in recognition of his generous support since its inception.

== Death ==
Puskar died in Morgantown, West Virginia, on October 7, 2011, from cancer.
