= Summertime Blues (EP) =

EP by Zach Bryan
- Released: July 15, 2022
- Length: 28:07
- Labels: Belting Bronco; Warner
- Producers: Zach Bryan; Eddie Spear

Zach Bryan chronology
American Heartbreak (2022)	Summertime Blues (2022)	All My Homies Hate Ticketmaster (Live from Red Rocks) (2022)

Singles from Zach Bryan
- 1. "Summertime Blues" Released: July 6, 2022

Summertime Blues is the second EP by American singer-songwriter Zach Bryan. The EP was released on July 15, 2022, through Belting Bronco and Warner Records. The EP was released two months after his major-label debut studio album, American Heartbreak. The track "Oklahoma Smokeshow" became a standout track and American musician Charles Wesley Godwin features on the track "Jamie".

== Background and composition ==
Two weeks after releasing American Heartbreak, Bryan immediately began teasing new music, beginning with "Twenty So". Bryan would continue to tease this new music a couple of weeks later again with the track "Oklahoma Smokeshow". Bryan would release the title track "Summertime Blues" on July 6, along with the announcement of the EP.

While developing the EP, Bryan intended for the release to be shorter but tracks would "slip onto the record by accident". Bryan enlisted the help of collaborator Charles Wesley Godwin, after developing a friendship over social media, and touring together, Godwin featured on the EP's track "Jamie".

== Track listing ==
All tracks are written by Zach Bryan.

Summertime Blues track listing
No.	Title	Length
1.	"Quittin' Time"	3:40
2.	"Motorcycle Drive By"	2:41
3.	"Summertime Blues"	3:01
4.	"Oklahoma Smokeshow"	3:31
5.	"Jamie" (featuring Charles Wesley Godwin)	3:40
6.	"Twenty So"	3:19
7.	"Us Then"	2:46
8.	"Matt and Audie"	2:06
9.	"All the Time"	3:19
Total length:		28:07

== Charts ==
=== Weekly charts ===
Weekly chart performance for Summertime Blues
Chart (2022–2026)	Peak position
Australian Albums (ARIA)	100
Canadian Albums (Billboard)	77
UK Country Albums (Official Charts)	7
US Billboard 200	34
US Americana/Folk Albums (Billboard)	2
US Top Country Albums (Billboard)	7
US Top Rock Albums (Billboard)	4

=== Year-end charts ===
2024 year-end chart performance for Summertime Blues
Chart (2024)	Position
Australian Country Albums (ARIA)	26
US Billboard 200	117
US Top Country Albums (Billboard)	26

2025 year-end chart performance for Summertime Blues
Chart (2025)	Position
US Top Country Albums (Billboard)	64

== Certifications ==
Certifications for Summertime Blues
Region	Certification	Certified units/sales
Canada (Music Canada)	Platinum	80,000^{‡}
New Zealand (RMNZ)	Gold	7,500^{‡}
United States (RIAA)	Platinum	1,000,000^{‡}
^{‡} Sales+streaming figures based on certification alone.
