= Monongalia County Schools =

School district in West Virginia, United States

- 1751 Earl L. Core Road Morgantown, WV, 26505

District information
- Superintendent: Dr. Eddie Campbell, Jr.
- Schools: 18

Other information
- Website: boe.mono.k12.wv.us

Morgantown High School, one of the schools in the Monongalia County Schools district.

Monongalia County Schools is the school district which serves Monongalia County, West Virginia. The central administration office is located in Morgantown. The district operates 18 public schools and serves over 11,400 students. Dr. Eddie Campbell, Jr. serves as the superintendent.

== Schools ==
=== High schools ===
- Clay/Battelle Middle-High School
- Morgantown High School
- University High School

=== Middle schools ===
- Clay/Battelle Middle-High School
- Mountaineer Middle School (formerly Cheat Lake Middle School)
- South Middle School
- Suncrest Middle School
- Westwood Middle School

=== Elementary schools ===
- Brookhaven Elementary School
- Cheat Lake Elementary School
- Eastwood Elementary School
- Mason Dixon Elementary School
- Mountainview Elementary School
- Mylan Park Elementary School
- North Elementary School
- Ridgedale Elementary School
- Skyview Elementary School
- Suncrest Primary School

=== Other ===
- Monongalia County Technical Education Center
