= Morgantown High School =

- The auditorium entrance of Morgantown High School

Location
- 109 Wilson Avenue; Morgantown, West Virginia 26501; United States; 39°37′27″N 79°57′23″W

Information
- Type: Public high school
- Established: 1883
- School district: Monongalia County School District
- Superintendent: Eddie Campbell
- Principal: Paul Mihalko
- Teaching staff: 97.13 (FTE)
- Grades: 9–12
- Student to teacher ratio: 18.06
- Campus type: Small city
- Colors: Red and blue
- Athletics conference: Ohio Valley Athletic Conference
- Team name: Mohigans
- Rival: University High School
- Website: mohigans.mono.k12.wv.us

Morgantown High School is a public high school in Morgantown, West Virginia, United States. It is one of three secondary schools in the Monongalia County School District. Athletic teams compete as the Morgantown Mohigans in the West Virginia Secondary School Activities Commission as a member of the Ohio Valley Athletic Conference.

In addition to sections of Morgantown, it serves Star City.

== Background ==
The institution has existed since 1883, and has operated on its current campus since 1927. Students largely come from one of the three feeder schools, South Middle School, Suncrest Middle School, or St. Francis de Sales Central Catholic. As of the 2023–2024 school year, it had an enrollment of 1,824 students, the largest in the state of West Virginia.

Among the school's student activities are over 20 varsity sports.

Morgantown High offers 23 Advanced Placement classes.

== Fine arts ==
The Morgantown High School Red & Blue Marching Band has performed in the Macy's Thanksgiving Day Parade in November 2009, the 2013 Tournament of Roses parade in Pasadena, California, and the 2014 National Cherry Blossom Festival Parade in Washington, D.C. In December 2016, the band represented West Virginia in the 75th Anniversary Commemoration Parade of Pearl Harbor in Honolulu, Hawaii. In April 2023, the band performed in Walt Disney World's Magic Kingdom amusement park located in Orlando, Florida. In April 2025, the band received first place in the 4A concert band class in the Smoky Mountain Music Festival in Gatlinburg, Tennessee.

== Athletics ==
Morgantown High School is the home of the Mohigans, the name of a non-existent Native American tribe whose name is a combination of the words "Morgantown (MO) High (HIG) Annual (AN)", the name of the school's original yearbook, originally created by an ancestor of Puderbaugh's (a prominent family in Morgantown). The Native American mascot and logo were adopted because of the close relation to the name Mohican, an actual Native American tribe.

In July 2020, a petition was launched to change the school mascot, logo, and majorette uniforms that include a variation of a traditional Native American headdress, on the grounds that it is an outdated caricature of Native American people. Counter-petitions, demanding the caricature remain, as well as petitions to change the MHS mascot to the Mothman, were also launched.

=== Rivalry ===
Morgantown High School and University High School have had a football rivalry known as the "MoHawk Bowl" since 1947. Morgantown leads the series 58–13–3, and has won 3 in a row.

=== State championships ===
Morgantown High School's athletic programs are well represented at the state level. MHS has produced over 60 West Virginia State Championships in multiple sports.

	State championships	State runners-up
Sport	Year(s)	Year(s)
Boys' cross country	1959, 1960, 1985, 1989, 2016, 2017, 2019	1984
Girls' cross country	2002, 2004, 2005, 2006, 2011, 2012, 2013, 2020, 2021	2001, 2003, 2007, 2014, 2015, 2016, 2017, 2019
Football	1927, 1983, 2000, 2002, 2004, 2005, 2025	1971, 1998
Golf	1976	1974, 2005
Girls' soccer	2011, 2019	2001
Boys' basketball	2016, 2022, 2023, 2024	1956, 2021
Girls' basketball	1977, 1990, 1992, 1993, 2005, 2007, 2014, 2015, 2016, 2023	1983, 1989, 2003, 2006, 2022, 2024
Baseball		1976, 2025, 2026
Boys' swimming		2002, 2003
Girls' swimming	2007, 2011, 2012	2004, 2013, 2014, 2015, 2016, 2021, 2022
Boys' tennis	1996, 1997
Girls' tennis	2019
Boys' track	1940
Girls' track	2000, 2012, 2017	2013, 2018, 2021, 2024
Boys' lacrosse	1998, 2005, 2006, 2008, 2012, 2023	1999, 2000, 2001, 2003, 2004, 2007, 2009, 2011,
Girls' lacrosse	1999, 2000, 2001, 2002, 2003, 2004, 2005, 2006, 2007, 2013, 2017	1998, 2012, 2015
Volleyball	2023	2024

== Awards and recognition ==
Morgantown High School has been highly ranked in school rankings. According to Niche, in 2023 it was ranked the top public high school in West Virginia and was ranked the second best high school in West Virginia in 2024 by U.S. News & World Report.

== In popular culture ==
Morgantown High School appears in the video game Fallout 76, set in West Virginia.

== Notable alumni ==
- Ralph Albertazzie, former Air Force One pilot
- Earl E. Anderson, Assistant Commandant of the Marine Corps (1971–1972)
- Joseph E. Antonini, former CEO of Kmart
- Carey Bailey, football coach
- Thomas W. Bennett, conscientious objector and Medal of Honor recipient
- Terry Bowden, football coach
- Tommy Bowden, football coach
- Wesley G. Bush, former CEO of Northrop Grumman
- Emily Calandrelli, science TV host on Xploration Station and Bill Nye Saves the World
- Thomas Canning, composer
- Curt Cignetti, college football head coach, currently at Indiana University
- Chaim Gingold, game designer
- Charles Wesley Godwin, country music artist
- Charles Harold Haden II, Chief Justice of the Supreme Court of Appeals of West Virginia
- Jay Jacobs, color analyst on MSNsportsNET.com
- Lawrence Kasdan, film producer, director, screenwriter
- Don Knotts, actor
- Chelsea Malone, singer and Miss West Virginia 2015
- David Newbold, comic book artist
- Asra Nomani, author
- Elliott Portnoy, attorney and chief executive of the law firm SNR Denton
- Rodney Pyles, member of the West Virginia House of Delegates
- David Selby, actor
- Michael Tomasky, journalist, author, editor in chief of Democracy quarterly journal
- Charles M. Vest, former president of MIT
- Rania Zuri, book desert advocate
