= Rich Braham =

American football player (born 1970)

No. 74
- Positions: Center, guard

Personal information
- Born: November 6, 1970 (age 55); Morgantown, West Virginia, U.S.
- Listed height: 6 ft 4 in (1.93 m)
- Listed weight: 305 lb (138 kg)

Career information
- High school: University (Morgantown, West Virginia)
- College: West Virginia
- NFL draft: 1994: 3rd round, 76th overall pick

Career history
- Arizona Cardinals (1994)*; Cincinnati Bengals (1994–2006)
- * Offseason or practice squad member only

Awards and highlights
- Cincinnati Bengals 40th Anniversary Team; First-team All-American (1993)

Career NFL statistics
- Games played: 146
- Games started: 142
- Fumble recoveries: 1
- Stats at Pro Football Reference

Rich Braham (born November 6, 1970) is an American former professional football player who was a center for the Cincinnati Bengals of the National Football League (NFL)]. Rich now lives in Morgantown, West Virginia.

== Early life ==
Braham attended University High School in Morgantown, West Virginia, where he lettered in both football and basketball. He won second-team prep All-State honors as a senior in basketball.

== College career ==
Braham attended West Virginia University, where, as a senior, he was a second-team All-American, an All-Big East selection, and helped lead the team to a Sugar Bowl berth and an 11 win-1 loss record.

== Professional career ==
Braham was selected by the Phoenix Cardinals in the 1994 NFL draft, but then was waived where he was picked up by the Cincinnati Bengals. He played with the Bengals for 13 seasons. At the end of the 2006 NFL season, Braham decided to announce his retirement after sustaining a knee injury during the week 2 game against the Cleveland Browns.
