= Don Panoz =

American entrepreneur (1935–2018)

Donald Panoz
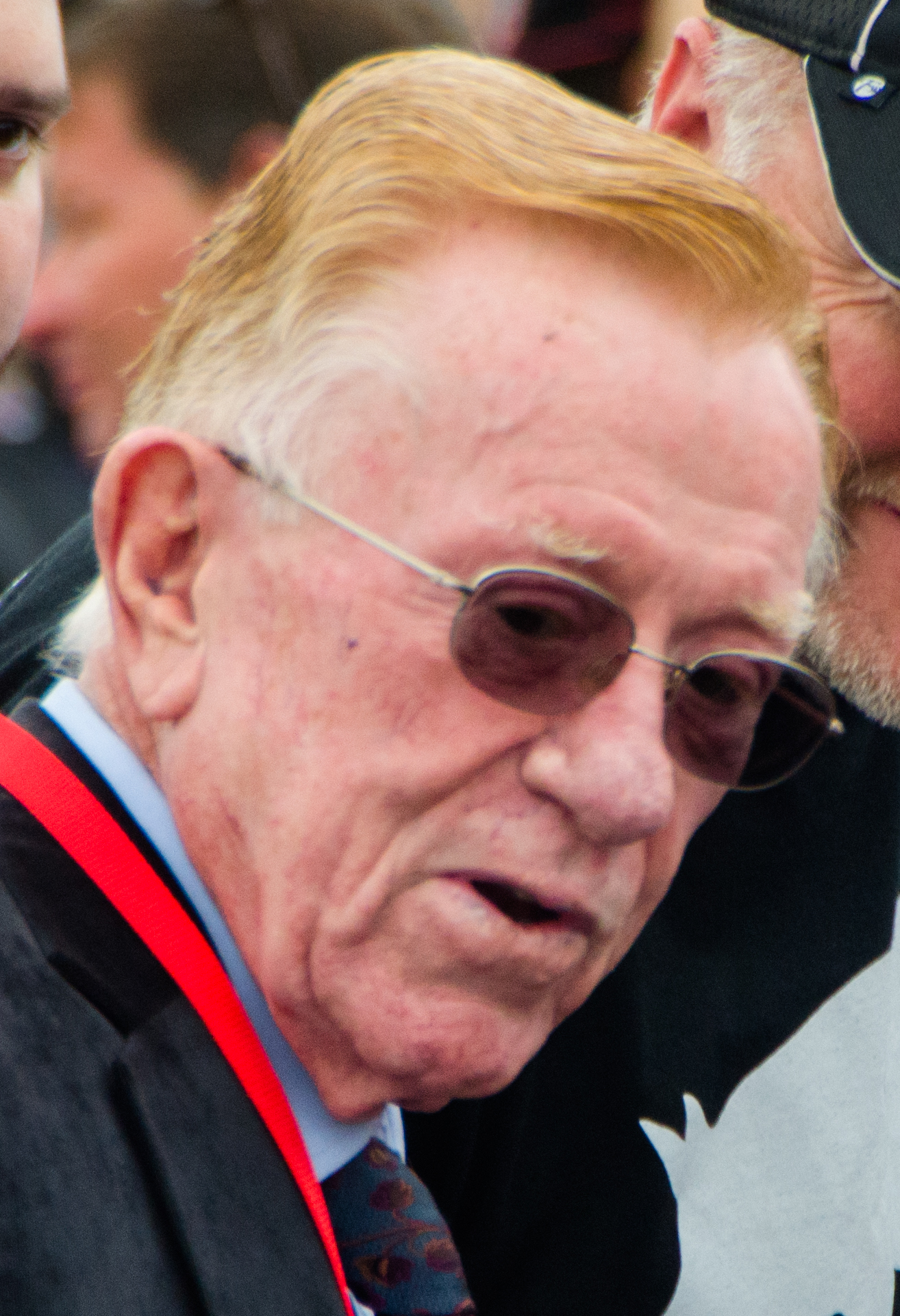
- Panoz at the 2017 Petit Le Mans
- Born: February 13, 1935; Alliance, OH, United States
- Died: September 11, 2018 (aged 83); Duluth, GA, United States
- Education: West Virginia University; Duquesne University; Greenbrier Military School
- Years active: 1961-2018
- Organization(s): Élan Corporation; Mylan Pharmaceuticals; Panoz; Van Diemen International; Road Atlanta
- Spouse: Nancy (m. 1955)
- Children: 6 (including Dan Panoz)
- Awards: Sprit of Le Mans - ACO
- Website: www.panoz.com

Donald Panoz (/ˈpeɪnoʊz/ PAY-nohz or /ˈpɑːnoʊz/ PAH-nohz; February 13, 1935 – September 11, 2018) was an American entrepreneur who founded two pharmaceutical companies.

== Early life ==
Panoz was an Italian-American. His father, Eugene Panunzio, immigrated to the United States from Avezzano, Italy in the 1900s. Eugene, who shortened his surname from the original Panunzio to Panoz, was a champion featherweight boxer.

Panoz attended Greenbrier Military School in Lewisburg, West Virginia, where he met Nancy, whom he would later marry. The two served in Japan with the United States Army, then moved to Pittsburgh upon their return to the United States.

== Business career ==
Panoz operated two drug stores in Pittsburgh while studying business at Duquesne University. In 1961, Panoz and Milan Puskar formed Milan Pharmaceuticals (which would later be renamed Mylan) in White Sulphur Springs, West Virginia. While head of this company, Panoz headed a research group that invented time-release medication through a transdermal patch, known most commonly in today's market for its nicotine application.

Panoz left Mylan in 1969 when the company refused to develop the patch, and subsequently moved the family to Ireland where he formed Élan Corporation. This company was an industry leader in drug delivery products and technology, and was the first Irish company to be publicly listed in the U.S. stock market. Panoz gradually reduced his stakes in the company, and it was bought by Perrigo in 2013.

Don and Nancy Panoz founded Château Élan Winery & Resort in Braselton, Georgia, in 1992. At the time of Don's death in 2018 the couple still owned the resort, which has since grown to 3,500 acres (14 km^{2}). The Panozes sold a portion of their businesses to three partners in 2004. Similarly in Patterson, California, 35 miles east of San Jose, the Panozes developed Diablo Grande gated community and the Diablo Grande Winery and Resort, which was sold In 2005; and later they founded the St. Andrews Bay Resort and Spa in Scotland. This venue has since been sold and is now managed by Fairmont Hotels and Resorts as the Fairmont St Andrews. These venues feature golf course designs and collaborations from Bruce Devlin, Denis Griffiths, Jack Nicklaus, Gene Sarazen, and Sam Torrance.

He was also the co-Founder and chairman of a water pollution control firm, HydroMentia, and was the Chairman of the Board of Directors for the Norcross, GA based indoor LED display manufacturer, NanoLumens.

== Panoz in motorsports ==
In 1989, Panoz funded an upstart company started by his son Dan, called Panoz Auto Development. Reportedly, the senior Panoz was skeptical at first of his son's venture, but later used his position in the business world to bring celebrity motorsport figures such as Mario Andretti on board with the goal of entering a Panoz race car in the 24 Hours of Le Mans race.

Panoz Motorsports was formed in 1997 in Braselton and entered its brand new car, the Panoz Esperante GTR-1, at Le Mans. The team was competitive, finishing ahead of all but two of the major factory teams in its class.

In 1999, Panoz founded the American Le Mans Series with the aim of bringing European-style endurance sports car racing to the Americas.

== Holdings ==
Today, the holdings of Panoz family include the following:

- Diablo Grande Winery & Resort
- Élan Natural Waters
- Fountainhead Development Corporation
- Panoz Auto Development Company
- Van Diemen International
- Panoz, LLC

Former holdings including:

- Sebring International Raceway (long-term lease) - Sold To NASCAR (IMSA Holdings, LLC)
- Road Atlanta - Sold To NASCAR (IMSA Holdings, LLC)
- Mosport International Raceway (long-term lease) - Sold To C.M.V. Ron Fellows, Carlo Fedani
- Chateau Elan Resort & The Vintage Golf Club, Hunter Valley, New South Wales, Australia

== Personal life and death ==
Panoz and his wife Nancy were married for 63 years. They had two sons, Danny and Chris, and four daughters, Dona, Dena, Lisa and Andrea.

Panoz died on September 11, 2018, of pancreatic cancer. He was 83.

== Bibliography ==
- Panoz, Donald E.; Goodman, Mickey (2021). Drinking, Driving and Drugs: Secrets of a Serial Entrepreneur. BookLogix. ISBN 978-1-61005-984-8.
