= Charles Wesley Godwin =

American country-folk musician

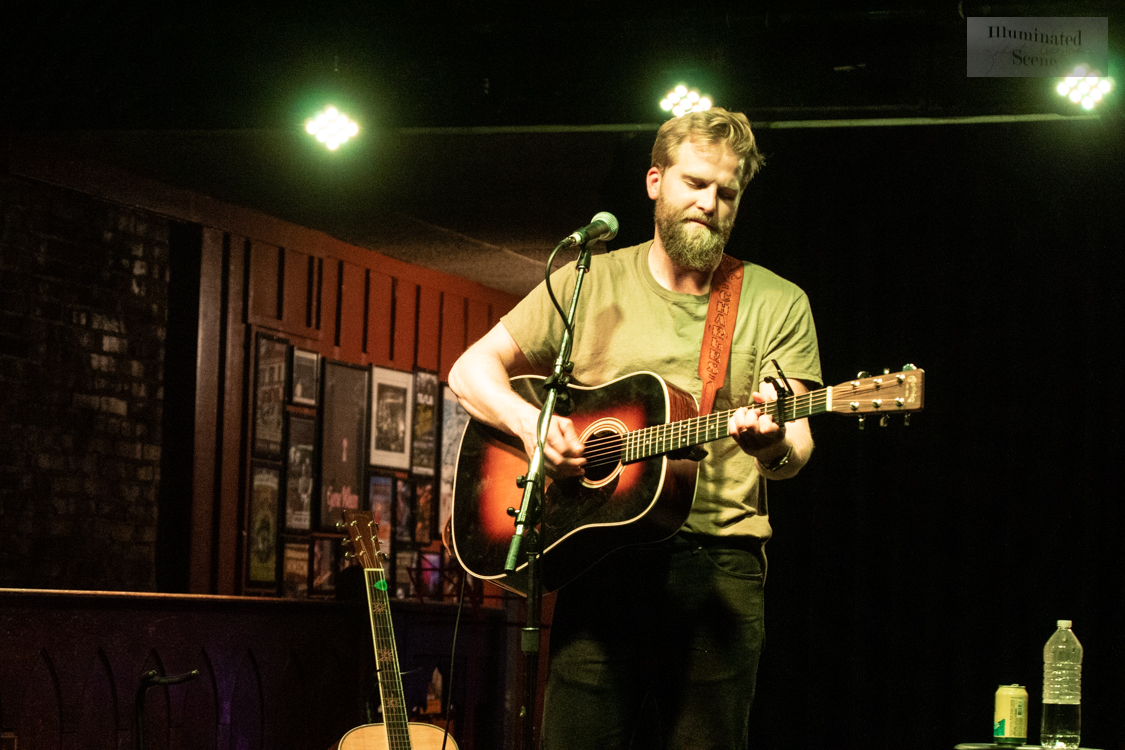

Background information
- Born: Charles Wesley Godwin; May 18, 1993 (age 33); Morgantown, West Virginia, United States
- Genre: Country
- Occupation: Singer-songwriter
- Instruments: Vocals; guitar; fiddle
- Years active: 2018–present
- Label: Big Loud
- Website: charleswgodwin.com

Charles Wesley Godwin (born May 18, 1993) is an American country-folk musician from West Virginia.

== Early life ==
Godwin was born in Morgantown, West Virginia. He played football in high school for Morgantown High School.

== Musical career ==
Godwin began playing music while studying finance at West Virginia University, where he first learned to play the guitar and practiced songwriting. He describes his musical style as inspired by "...artists such as Kris Kristofferson, Willie Nelson, John Prine, Chris Knight and Ryan Bingham". His first album, Seneca, was released on February 15, 2019.

His second project, How the Mighty Fall, was released on November 5, 2021, and was also received positively, being described as less autobiographical and more focused on telling other people's stories, compared to his previous record.

Godwin has toured with Zach Bryan, whom he collaborated with on Bryan's song “Jamie”, on Bryan's 2022 EP, Summertime Blues. The song and album were released on July 15, 2022.

Godwin was featured on Huey Mack's song "Carry Me Home", the 1st track on Mack's 6th album The Cozy Bar, it was released on October 21, 2022.

Godwin released a live EP, Live from the Church, on February 17, 2023. The track list included covers of Chris Knight's "The Jealous Kind" and Bryan's "Crooked Teeth," as well as live versions of several songs from How the Mighty Fall.

Charles was featured on the soundtrack for The Hunger Games: The Ballads of Songbirds & Snakes, with “Winter’s Come and Gone”. The song and film were released on November 17, 2023.

He released his third full length studio project, Family Ties, on September 22, 2023. The album was released under the Big Loud label, who signed Godwin in early 2023. Family Ties centers of Godwin's relationship with his family and includes tributes to many of his close relatives; for example, "Miner Imperfections" honors his father, "All Again" is addressed to his wife, Samantha, “Gabriel” is addressed to his son, and "Dance in the Rain" is addressed to his daughter. “Cue Country Roads”, the 17th song on the album, honors West Virginia University’s tradition of playing John Denver’s “Take Me Home, Country Roads” after sporting event victories. "10-38", written by Godwin, is a direct sequel to Bruce Springsteen's 1982 song, "State Trooper", of which Godwin also covered. A single was release with both songs on September 23, 2024.

Godwin collaborated with Evan Honer to release a version of "Mr. Meyers", titled "Mr. Meyers (Charles Wesley Godwin Version)"; it was released on October 11, 2024

He released his first non-live EP album Lonely Mountain Town on February 28, 2025.

His debut single, "Better That Way" featuring Luke Combs is scheduled to immediately impact country radio on May 18, 2026, as the lead single from his fourth studio album, Christian Name.

== Discography ==
=== Studio albums ===
- Seneca (2019)
- How the Mighty Fall (2021)
- Family Ties (2023)
- Christian Name (2026)

=== Live albums ===
- Live from the Steel City (2025)

=== EPs ===
- Live from the Church (2023)
- Live from Echo Mountain (2024)
- Lonely Mountain Town (2025)

=== Singles ===
- "State Trooper" / "10–38" (2024)
- "Better That Way" (with Luke Combs, 2026)

=== Charted and certified songs ===
Title	Year	Peak chart positions		Certifications	Album
Title	Year	US Country Airplay	NZ Hot	Certifications	Album
"Jamie" (Zach Bryan featuring Charles Wesley Godwin)	2022	—	—	MC: Gold	Summertime Blues
"All Again"	2023	—	—	RIAA: Gold	Family Ties
"Better That Way" (with Luke Combs)	2026	43	25		Christian Name
