= Free clinic =

Non-profit health care clinics in the US

Free Clinic of Simi Valley, Simi Valley, California

A free clinic or walk in clinic is a health care facility in the United States offering services to economically disadvantaged individuals for free or at a nominal cost. The need for such a clinic arises in societies where there is no universal healthcare, and therefore a social safety net has arisen in its place. Core staff members may hold full-time paid positions, however, most of the staff a patient will encounter are volunteers drawn from the local medical community.

Free clinics are non-profit facilities, funded by government or private donors, that provide primary care, preventive healthcare, and additional health services to the medically underserved. Many free clinics are made possible through the service of volunteers, the donation of goods, and community support, because many free clinics receive little government funding.

Regardless of health insurance coverage, all individuals can receive health services from free clinics. However, said services are intended for persons with limited incomes, no health insurance, and/or who do not qualify for Medicaid and Medicare. Also included are underinsured individuals; meaning those who have only limited medical coverage (such as catastrophic care coverage, but not regular coverage), or who have insurance, but their policies include high medical deductibles that they are unable to afford. To offset costs, some clinics charge a nominal fee to those whose income is deemed sufficient to pay a fee. Clinics often use the term "underinsured" to describe the working poor.

Most free clinics provide treatment for routine illness or injuries; and long-term chronic conditions such as high blood pressure, diabetes, asthma and high cholesterol. Many also provide a limited range of medical testing, prescription drug assistance, women's health care, and dental care. Free clinics do not function as emergency care providers, and most do not handle employment related injuries. Few, if any, free clinics offer care for chronic pain as that would require them to dispense narcotics. For a free clinic such care is almost always cost-prohibitive. Handling narcotics requires a high level of physical security for the staff and building along with more paperwork and government regulation compared to what other prescription medications require.

== History ==
At the turn of the century, healthcare in the United States became privatized despite many efforts by President Roosevelt and others to establish national health insurance, causing the healthcare system to neglect the lower classes. Starting in the 1950s, there have been incremental reforms to offset healthcare market failures and to better deliver healthcare services to low-income and underserved populations, including Medicaid and Medicare. Since then, there have still been increasing inequality and issues in coverage, access, cost, and quality of healthcare in America. In the United States, free clinics are a way to address this inequality and lack of universal healthcare, and as part of a health safety net.

The modern concept of a free clinic originated in 1950 in Detroit and was named the St. Frances Cabrini Clinic. However, the first documented free clinic is considered to be the Haight Ashbury Free Medical Clinic in California which was started by Dr. David E. Smith in 1967. These clinics coined the phrase, "health care is a right not a privilege" and they served vulnerable veteran populations after the Vietnam war, many of whom struggled with drug abuse. The Haight Ashbury Free Clinic revolutionized the practice of handling substance abuse issues by holding national conferences and working directly with the Food and Drug Administration and other government agencies to create comprehensive policies and to destigmatize mental health conditions related to drug abuse. From there free clinics spread to other California cities and then across the United States, such as the Berkeley Free Clinic. Many free clinics were originally started in the 1960s and 1970s to provide drug treatments. Each one offered a unique set of services, reflecting the particular needs and resources of the local community. Some were established to provide medical services in the inner cities, while others opened in the suburbs and many student-run free clinics have emerged that serve the underserved as well as provide a medical training site for students in the health professions. From 1968 through the 1970s, the Black Panther Party established several Peoples’ Free Medical Clinics as part of their efforts to counter systemic discrimination against Black people in hospitals and private medical practices. The Peoples' Free Medical Clinics served as an advocating body as well. These clinics helped integrate the sector of health care into political and social spheres within the United States. Their efforts played a key role in social reform in health care that ultimately led to the passage of the Medicare and Medicaid act of 1965.

In 2001 the National Association of Free and Charitable Clinics (NAFC) was founded in Washington, D.C. to advocate for the issues and concerns of free and charitable clinics. Free clinics are defined by the NAFC as "safety-net health care organizations that utilize a volunteer/staff model to provide a range of medical, dental, pharmacy, vision and/or behavioral health services to economically disadvantaged individuals. Such clinics are 501(c)3 tax-exempt organizations, or operate as a program component or affiliate of a 501(c)(3) organization." In time various state and regional organizations were formed including the Free Clinics of the Great Lakes Region, Texas Association of Charitable Clinic (TXACC), North Carolina Association of Free Clinics, Ohio Association of Free Clinics and the Virginia Association of Free and Charitable Clinics (est. 1993). In 2005 Empowering Community Healthcare Outreach (ECHO) was established to assist churches and other community organizations start and run free and charitable clinics.

In 2010, the Patient Protection and Affordable Care Act (ACA) was passed as a reform that aimed to make healthcare insurance more accessible to low and middle-class families. Specifically, it subsidized low-income populations’ purchase of individual coverage. It also incentivized employers to provide coverage to low-income employees, and made it mandatory for states to expand Medicaid to include non-disabled and young people with incomes that were below 138% of the federal poverty line. Studies show the ACA has been successful in redressing inequality in the access to healthcare. In 2015, there was a “4.2 percentage point increase in full-year insurance for the poor and 5.3 point increase for the near-poor”.

However, the implementation of the ACA proved to be more challenging as some states chose not to enforce it. Additionally, the ACA does not support undocumented immigrants, which means that health care outside of the free clinic to those who are undocumented remain relatively inaccessible. The ACA also does not reach homeless populations. Barriers include this population's low healthcare literacy, the requirements of residency verification, their difficulty accessing/applying for social services, their access to transportation, and the fact that many healthcare facilities do not accept Medicaid. It is not yet clear if and how the Trump administration will influence healthcare reform, specifically the access to healthcare for the most vulnerable. Trump often speaks out against the ACA; some scholars worry that President Trump's 2017 executive order, which eliminated cost-sharing reductions in the ACA, will result in an overall decrease in the number of people who can access affordable healthcare, thus emphasizing the need for free clinics.

== Patient demographics ==
Of the 41 million uninsured people in the United States, the 355 officially registered free clinics in the country are only able to provide services to about 650,000 of them. On average, free clinics have annual budgets of $458,028 and have 5,989 annual patient visits. In another survey of three free clinics, 82% of patients reported that they began using a free clinics because they have are uninsured, and 59% were referred by friends/family. A similar study found that 65% were unemployed with students making up 17%. There also seems to be little correlation between education or employment status and insurance coverage in free clinic patients.

Age groups at clinics
Age Group	%
0-18	0.6
18-44	29.4
45-64	67.1
65+	3.2

Free clinic patients are mainly low-income, uninsured, female, immigrants, or minorities. About 75% of free clinic patients are between the ages of 18 and 64 years old. According to another study, 70% of all patients 20 years and older make less than US$10,000 a year.

Income groups at clinics
Income	%
≤ $10,400	52.9
$10,400 - $41,600	45.6
≥ $41,600	1.5

In a 1992-1997 survey of the Charlottesville Free Clinic, the patient body consists largely of a low income working class that reflects the demographics of the Charlottesville area. Most of the patients reported that without the free clinic, they would either seek the emergency room or do nothing at all if they got sick. There has been a shift over the years from patients seeking urgent care to patients seeking treatment for chronic illnesses. Combined, these factors suggest that free clinics will require additional resources in order to meet the rising demands of their patient population.

In a study of the Miami Rescue Mission Clinic in Florida, the most common conditions were mental health, circulatory system, and musculoskeletal system disorder. The most common of the mental health disorders were depressive disorders and anxiety disorders. Throughout multiple studies about patient demographics in metropolitan settings, there was a higher than national average prevalence of mental health disorder, obesity, diabetes, and smoking in free clinic patients.

Common medical conditions at clinics
System	% in patients
Circulatory	14.7
Respiratory (Acute)	6.15
Respiratory (Chronic)	4.49
Gastrointestinal	7.21
Genitourinary	5.44
Endocrine	6.26
Musculoskeletal	13.9
Nervous	6.15
Renal	0.12
Eye	3.54
Skin	6.74
Teeth	2.84
Mental health	19.3

Mental health disorders at clinics
Condition	% in Patients
Depression	12.5
Anxiety	11.8
Bipolar Disorder	3.55
Schizophrenia	2.48
Other	3.78

== Operation and services ==
Some free clinics specialize in providing primary care (acute care), while others focus on long-term chronic health issues, and many do both. Most free clinics start out seeing patients only one or two days per week, and then expand as they find additional volunteers. Because they rely on volunteers, most are only open a few hours per day; primarily in the late afternoon and early evening. Some free clinics are faith-based, meaning they are sponsored by and affiliated with a specific church or religious denomination, or they are interfaith and draw support from several different denominations or religions.

Free clinics rely on donations for financial support. The amount of money they take in through donations to a large degree determines how many patients they are able to see. Because they are unlikely to have the resources to see everyone who might need their help, they usually limit who they are willing to see to just those from their own community and the surrounding areas, and especially in chronic care will only see patients from within a limited set of medical conditions.

Free clinics function as health care safety nets for patients who cannot afford or access other forms of healthcare. They provide essential services regardless of the patient's ability to pay. Hospital emergency rooms are required by federal law to treat everyone regardless of their ability to pay, so people who lack the means to pay for care often seek treatment in emergency rooms for minor ailments. These hospitals function as safety net hospitals. Treating people in the ER is expensive, though, and it ties up resources designed for emergencies. When a community has a free clinic, hospitals can steer patients with simple concerns to the free clinic instead of the emergency room. Free clinics can save hospital emergency rooms thousands of dollars. A $1 investment in a free clinic can save $36 in healthcare costs at another center. For this reason, most hospitals are supportive of free clinics. Hospitals are a primary source for equipment and supplies for free clinics. When they upgrade equipment, they will often donate the older equipment to the local free clinic. In addition some hospitals supply most or all of a local clinics day-to-day medical supplies, and some do lab work free of cost as well.

=== Social workers ===
Social workers support the work of medical practitioners in free clinics. They work alongside medical staff in the clinical setting and help staff address social factors that may be affecting patient health. Their role is to bring a personalized touch to patient care alongside the medical/health perspective. Caseworkers and volunteers are more able to connect with the patients on a personal level. More and more free clinics, such as the Texas Free Clinic, emphasize the importance of simply talking to the patients and creating a one-on-one relationship with them, as research has shown this has a positive impact on the patients’ mental health. This ensures a more comprehensive approach to patient care which has been deemed necessary by many health studies conducted on the work of free clinics.

Since free clinics serve as a resource for marginalized groups, it is essential that their practices provide comprehensive care that reflects the concerns of their patients. The presence of a social worker in a free health clinic would bring someone along who has been trained to understand how situational factors could affect a patient's health. With a social worker present, patients would have more representation and acknowledgement regarding their experiences.

Numerous studies indicate that the integration of social workers into free clinics remains a work in progress. Even when free clinics offer the services of a social worker, a significant number of patients do not avail themselves of these resources. This can be attributed to a lack of awareness about the services provided or reluctance to seek assistance. Research findings suggest that a primary factor contributing to the underutilization of social work services is the insufficient emphasis placed on them compared to acute medical care within clinic settings. To optimize the effectiveness of this model, it is crucial to establish a balanced presence of both social workers and medical staff within the clinical setting, with equal recognition of their importance to overall health.

== Medical malpractice liability ==
Free clinics can be granted medical malpractice coverage through the Federal Tort Claims Act (FTCA). FTCA coverage includes health care professionals who are acting as volunteers. In addition it covers officers, board members, clinic employees, and individual contractors. Medical malpractice coverage does not occur automatically, each organization must be "deemed" eligible by the US Department of Health and Human Services. To be eligible the clinic must be an IRS recognized nonprofit, that does not accept payments from insurance companies, the government, or other organizations for the services it performs. It also must not charge patients for services. It may receive donations from anyone and any organization; the stipulation is that it may not receive financial reimbursement for service rendered, which by definition a free clinic does not.

The Volunteer Protection Act of 1997 provides immunity from tort claims such as negligence, bodily injury, pain and suffering that might be filed against the volunteers of nonprofit organizations. Thus, volunteers working on behalf of a nonprofit free clinic are covered under the Volunteer Protection Act from most liability claims.

Individual states may offer additional legal protections to free clinics, usually under the states Good Samaritan laws. Free clinics must still carry general liability insurance, to cover non-medical liability, such as slips and falls in the parking lot.

== Prescription and medical assistance programs ==
Some pharmaceutical companies offer assistance programs for the drugs they manufacture. These programs allow those who are unable to pay for their medications to receive prescription drugs for free or at a greatly reduced cost. Many free clinics work to qualify patients on behalf of these programs. In some cases the clinic receive and then distribute the medications themselves, in others they verify that the patient is eligible for the program, and the medication is then shipped to the patient, or patient receives the medication from a local pharmacy.

Some free clinics sole mission is to help those who do not have prescription drug coverage, and cannot afford for their medications, to enroll in prescription assistance programs. Such clinics are known as "clinics without walls" because they dispense with the need to have their own building, exam rooms, or clinical equipment.

More generically, there are also medical assistance programs being offered. For example, with a Free Clinic in central Texas, there is a heavy emphasis with partnering with local mental health programs in their area. Additionally, statistics showed that patients were able to engage and socialize with the facilitators working with such programs. Individuals within the clinic were able to learn from the presentations and educational workshops the assistance programs offered.

== Dentistry ==
Some free clinics are able to assist with dental problems. This is handled either at the clinic itself, if the clinic has its own dental facilities and a dentist; or it is facilitated through a partnership with one or more local dentist who are willing to take referred patients for free. For example, a clinic might have ten local dentists who will each accept two patients per month, so this allows the clinic to treat a total of twenty dental patients each month.

Some clinics use a referral system to handle other forms of specialized medical care.

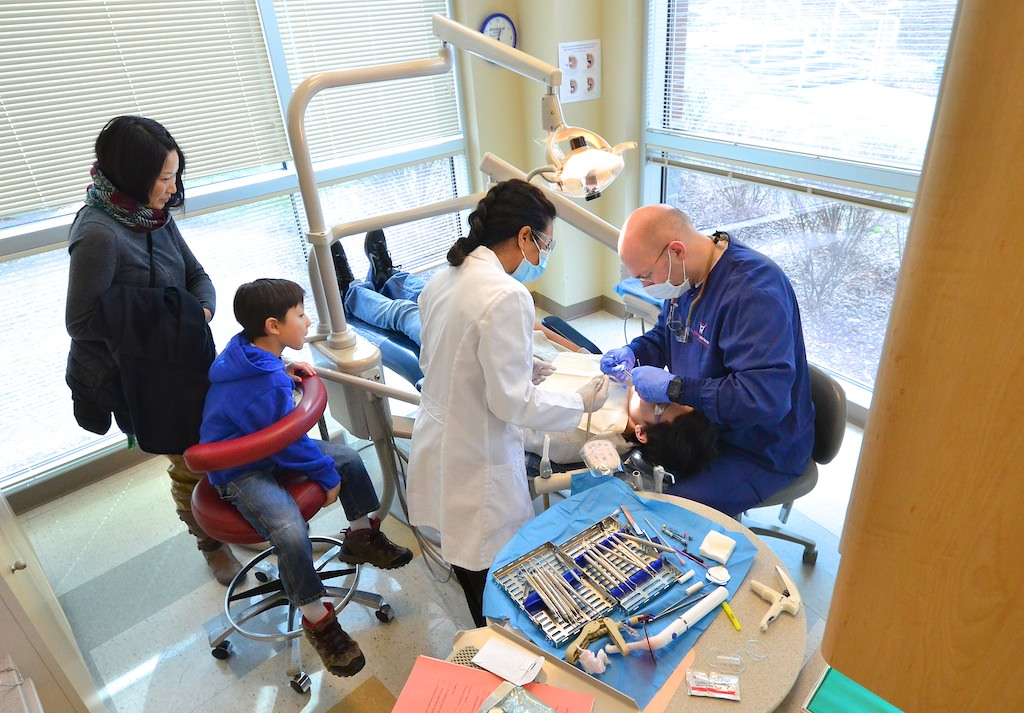
Stafford County residents watch a Germanna Community College dental hygiene student work on a patient during a free dental clinic sponsored by the school's dental program at the Moss Free Clinic in Fredericksburg, Virginia.

== Student-run free clinics ==
Student-run clinics (SRC) are an increasingly prevalent part of US medical school curricula, and they are designed to improve health-care delivery to underserved populations. The vast majority of these clinics are free-of-charge and they have been shown to result in high patient satisfaction The preventive medicine interventions offered at this clinics have been proved to have significantly high health and economic impacts.

Free clinics allow student volunteers to become more socially aware and culturally competent in their medical experience. Medical schools sometimes do not address social determinants of health or treatment of underserved populations, and medical students can use free clinic volunteering to learn about these issues. At free clinics, medical student volunteers learn to listen to the full history of their patients and treat them as a whole rather than a list of symptoms. Medical students also get invaluable hands-on experience that complements their classroom learning. Through direct patient interactions, students develop clinical skills, enhance their ability to take comprehensive patient histories, and learn to approach patient care from a holistic perspective.

Additionally, working in SRCs exposes students to the realities of healthcare delivery in under-served communities, which allows them to foster a deeper understanding of the social determinants of health and to develop cultural competency. Medical students balance the power dynamic between the patient and provider, acting as a patient advocate. Furthermore, students who are exposed to SRCs are more likely than their peers to continue to work with underserved populations after graduation.

An example of a student-run free clinic that addresses the social determinants of health treatment is one in the University of Washington, called Students in the Community (SITC). This clinic is the only student-run clinic to be run out of a transitional housing facility for the homeless. This clinic model speaks to the embrace by student-run clinics of the increasingly prevalent holistic approach to healthcare—one that considers the social determinants of health, such as housing, as shown through its housing-first model.

The Society of Student-Run Free Clinics (SSRFC) hosts a national inter-professional platform for student-run clinics. This allows the sharing of ideas, collaborate on research, information about funding resources and encourages the expansion of existing clinics as well as the cultivate of the new ones. The SSRFC faculty network works to facilitate collaboration between student-run free clinics.

== Effectiveness ==
There are several proposed advantages to free clinics. They tend to be located in communities where there is a great need for health care. Free clinics are more flexible in structure than established medical institutions. They are also much less expensive - hence the title "free clinic." Due to their small size, their organization tends to be more egalitarian and less hierarchical, which allows for more direct exchange of information across the clinic. Unlike regular practices, they also attempt to do more than just provide healthcare. Some were created as political acts meant to advocate for socialized medicine and society.

Evidence shows that patients served by SRCs experience improved access to care, better management of chronic conditions, and higher satisfaction with their healthcare experience. Furthermore, research conducted within SRCs contributes to the body of knowledge on effective strategies for addressing healthcare disparities and advancing health equity. By leveraging research findings, SRCs can advocate for resources, inform best practices, and continuously improve their services to better meet the needs of under-served populations.

However, they do come with their own set of problems. Many free clinics lack funding and do not have enough volunteers. This can contribute to a short availability of free clinics' operation hours, and can harm free clinics' ability to provide long-term, sustainable service. For instance, they are a solution aimed towards serving tens of millions of uninsured Americans, but they function solely on the spirit of altruism. Volunteers must be willing to be available during strange hours of the day and provide professional-level care all without the possibility of financial reimbursement. Additionally, the ability of free clinics to provide long term, sustainable service and maintain continuity of care for patients is questionable, considering the instability of funding and providers. One proposition towards overcoming these challenges involves the creation of a national foundation that officially assists and connects free clinics, allowing them to evolve as necessary.

In a national level survey of patients and providers at free clinics, 97% of patients were satisfied with their care, and a further 77% preferred it over their prior care. 86% of patients relied on the clinic for primary care, and 80% of patients relied on them for pharmacy services. When asked what they would do if the free clinic did not exist, 47% would look for another free clinic, 24% would not seek care, 21% would not seek care due to costs, and 23% would use the emergency room.

== Locations and facilities ==
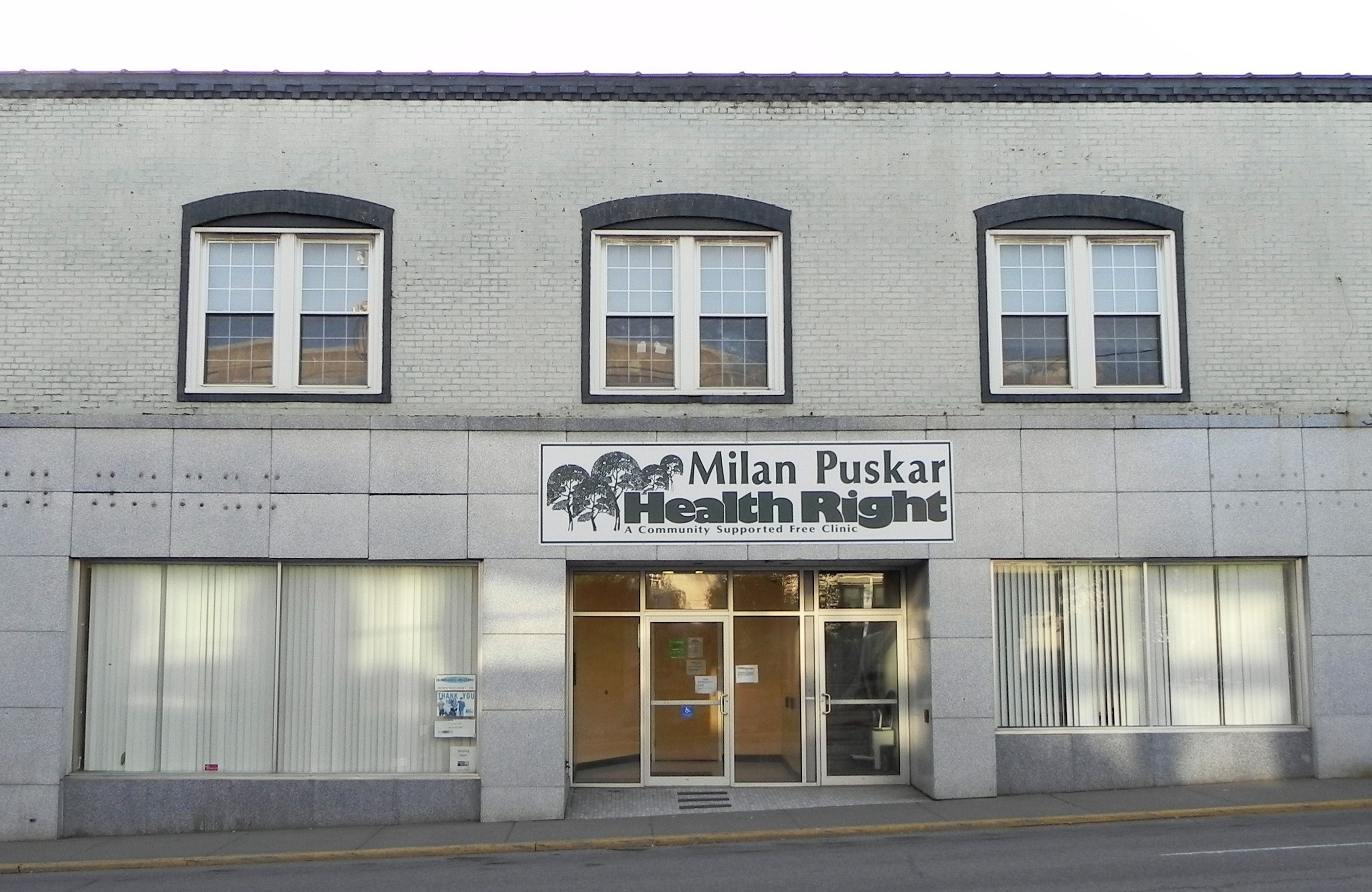
Milan Puskar Health Right free clinic in Morgantown, West Virginia

Free clinics are usually located near the people they are trying to serve. In most cases they are located near other nonprofits that serve the same target community such as food-banks, Head Start, Goodwill Industries, the Salvation Army and public housing. Because free clinics often refer people to other medical facilities for lab work, dentistry, and other services, they may also be found in the same area of town as those medical facilities. Some clinics have working agreements with the other facilities that are willing to assist with the clinics mission. Being close to the other medical facilities makes it easier for patients to get from one to the other.

Contrary to a common assumption, currently existing free clinics were not necessarily established to respond to an increase in the number of individuals who cannot afford healthcare in a given community. The prevalence of free clinics in certain areas is due to the availability of financial and human resources. For example, being close to teaching hospitals, universities, and medical facilities makes it easier to find medically trained volunteers. Furthermore, the lack of Federally Qualified Health Centers (FQHC) and other safety-net providers within a certain area often becomes the perceived need that motivates community leaders to establish a free clinic.

Most free clinics start out using donated space; others start by renting or leasing space. In time and with enough community support, many go on to acquire their own buildings. Donated space may be an entire building, or it might be a couple of rooms within a church, hospital, or another business. Because the clinic will house confidential medical records, prescription medications, and must remain as clean as possible, donated space is usually set aside for the sole use of the clinic even when the clinic is closed.

The National Association of Free & Charitable Clinics maintains a database of 1,200 free and charitable clinics.

Location of Clinics
Region	%
Midwest	29.3
Northwest	10.8
South	54.7
West	5.3

== See also ==
- Community health centers in the United States
- Formulary (pharmacy)
- Health equity
- Nonprofit organization
- Rural health clinic
- Volunteers in Medicine
- Marvin Ronning
- Barbara McInnis
