= Rania Zuri =

Book desert advocate

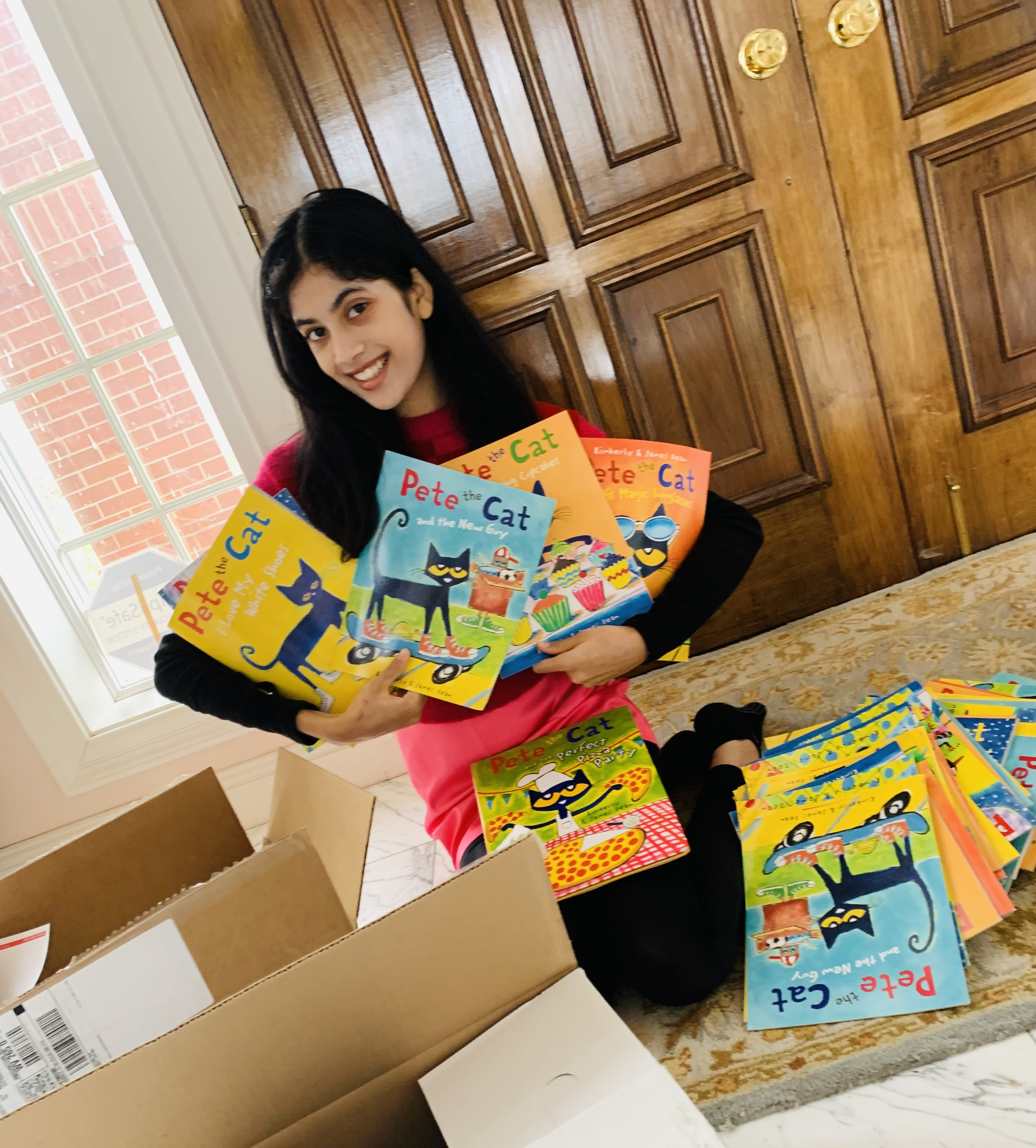
- Education: Stanford University
- Organization(s): The LiTEArary Society, Inc.
- Awards: Forbes 30 Under 30
- Website: www.LiTEArarySociety.org

Rania Zuri is an American advocate for early childhood literacy and works to end book deserts for disadvantaged children. She is the founder and CEO of The LiTEArary Society and is the youngest author of a United States Senate Resolution in U.S. history.

== The LiTEArary Society ==
At age 13, Rania Zuri founded The LiTEArary Society, Inc., a 501(c)(3) non-profit organization with the mission of ending book deserts for disadvantaged preschool children. She learned about book deserts from a combination of her grandfather growing up in a book desert and after setting up a small library for young girls which inspired her to turn her middle school book club into The LiTEArary Society.

In 2022, The LiTEArary Society expanded and completed a project called the West Virginia Head Start Road tour where a brand-new, Scholastic book was donated to every enrolled child in Head Start in West Virginia, 6,778 books in total. Rania personally travelled across West Virginia to each Head Start center to drop off the books for the children.

For her work with The LiTEArary Society, Rania Zuri has been featured on many national media sources, including Good Morning America, NBC Nightly News with Lester Holt, The Today Show, The Kelly Clarkson Show, Forbes, Teen Vogue, Fox News, NPR, The Washington Post and more. The LiTEArary Society has sponsorships and partnerships with National Head Start, Scholastic, Pilot Pens, Hershey's, Starbucks, and others.

As of October 2023, The LiTEArary Society has donated over $326,000 worth of brand-new books to over 28,000 disadvantaged preschool children in Head Start programs in all 50 states.

== U.S. Senate Resolution ==
In October 2023, Rania became the youngest author of a U.S. Senate Resolution in history. She authored a bipartisan U.S. Senate Resolution for the first National Early Childhood Literacy Awareness Day on October 20 to bring awareness to early childhood literacy issues. The U.S. Senate resolution for this commemorative day is sponsored by U.S. Senator Joe Manchin, Senator Susan Collins, Senator Shelley Moore Capito, and Senator Angus King. The resolution "unanimously" passed in the U.S. Senate in October 2023.

Prior to becoming a U.S. Senate Resolution, Rania established National Early Childhood Literacy Awareness Day as a West Virginia State proclamation by Governor Jim Justice in July 2023.

== Journalism ==
Rania wrote a 2022 article for Teen Vogue about book deserts and literacy. In August 2022, she also wrote an opinion piece about education and standardized testing for NBC News Online.

Following the passing of the U.S. Senate Resolution she authored, she wrote another op-ed for Teen Vogue about literacy rates and ending book deserts through policy.

== Public Speaking ==
Rania has given a TEDx Talk about book deserts with over 40,000 views on Youtube and TED.com combined. She also was a guest on NPR's Inside Appalachia and NPR's 1A radio show.

== Recognitions and accolades ==
On International Day of the Girl in 2023, Rania was honored at the White House by First Lady Jill Biden as a "Girl Leading Change". Rania Zuri is also a Coca-Cola Scholar (2023), a recipient of the George H. W. Point of Light Award, and a winner of the Gloria Barron Prize for Young Heroes. In 2022, Forbes named her as one of "Six Teens Making the World a Better Place."

In 2023, Rania received The Diana Award, one of the most prestigious international accolades a young person (ages 8 to 25) can receive for social or humanitarian work. During the online Diana Award Ceremony, Rania was one of only 3 recipients out of the 189 global recipients to be introduced by Prince Harry.

In June 2022, Governor Jim Justice of West Virginia honored Rania with the Distinguished Mountaineer Award, the highest honor that is given to one or two WV citizens per year.

In November 2023, Rania was named on the Forbes 30 Under 30 list in the Education category and on the Youngest list.
