= American Heartbreak =

Studio album by Zach Bryan
- Released: May 20, 2022
- Genres: Red dirt; heartland rock
- Length: 121:21
- Labels: Belting Bronco; Warner
- Producers: Eddie Spear; Louie Nice; Zach Bryan; Colton Jean; Ryan Hadlock

Zach Bryan chronology
Quiet, Heavy Dreams (2020)	American Heartbreak (2022)	Summertime Blues (2022)

Singles from American Heartbreak
- 1. "Oklahoma City" Released: August 21, 2020; 2. "From Austin" Released: February 25, 2022; 3. "Highway Boys" Released: March 25, 2022; 4. "Late July" Released: April 12, 2022; 5. "Something in the Orange" Released: April 22, 2022; 6. "Open the Gate" Released: May 6, 2022

American Heartbreak is the third studio album by American singer-songwriter Zach Bryan, released on May 20, 2022, through Belting Bronco and Warner Records. It is a triple album and Bryan's major-label debut. The album was preceded by six singles, including "Something in the Orange", which reached number 10 on the US Billboard Hot 100. Bryan toured the US until November 2022 in support of the record.

== Background ==
Bryan explained that the album "explores the past five years" of his life, further calling it his "effort at trying to explain what being a 26-year-old man in America is like. There's love, loss, rivalry, resentment, and forgiveness all wrapped into one piece of work". The Tennessean wrote that the album ranges "from demo-like ruminations to full-fledged heartland rock anthems" as well as an "untamed restlessness and blurry-eyed angst".

== Commercial performance ==
American Heartbreak debuted at number five on the US Billboard 200 with 71,500 album-equivalent units, including 6,000 pure album sales, making it the biggest first week for a country album in 2022. On the day of its release, American Heartbreak achieved the most streams of any country album in 2022 on both Spotify and Apple Music. As of October 2022, the album has sold 702,000 album units in the U.S. alone.

== This Road I Know ==
The track "This Road I Know" is not a traditional Zach Bryan song. Instead, this track is a poem that brings heartfelt nostalgia to the album.When Zach Bryan was a child, poetry was his true passion. However, as he grew older, he began writing songs.This poem was his way of adding a piece of his childhood to the album. This is the first album on which he included a poem. However, he continued the trend in his next three albums.

== Track listing ==
All tracks written by Zach Bryan except "You Are My Sunshine" (written by Jimmie Davis and Charles Mitchell).

American Heartbreak track listing
No.	Title	Length
1.	"Late July"	2:58
2.	"Something in the Orange" (Z&E's version)	4:14
3.	"Heavy Eyes"	3:10
4.	"Mine Again"	3:44
5.	"Happy Instead"	4:09
6.	"Right Now the Best"	3:10
7.	"The Outskirts"	3:18
8.	"Younger Years"	3:25
9.	"Cold Damn Vampires"	4:52
10.	"Tishomingo"	3:08
11.	"She's Alright"	3:49
12.	"You Are My Sunshine"	2:57
13.	"Darling"	3:57
14.	"Ninth Cloud"	3:23
15.	"Oklahoma City"	4:00
16.	"Sun to Me"	2:43
17.	"Highway Boys"	3:40
18.	"Whiskey Fever"	3:32
19.	"Billy Stay"	5:16
20.	"Sober Side of Sorry"	3:33
21.	"High Beams"	3:20
22.	"The Good I'll Do"	3:31
23.	"Someday (Maggie's)"	4:25
24.	"Poems and Closing Time"	2:41
25.	"From Austin"	3:27
26.	"If She Wants a Cowboy"	3:12
27.	"Corinthians (Proctor's)"	3:51
28.	"Open the Gate"	3:54
29.	"Half Grown"	3:27
30.	"No Cure"	2:41
31.	"'68 Fastback"	3:13
32.	"Blue"	3:38
33.	"Morning Time"	3:45
34.	"This Road I Know"	3:24
Total length:		121:21

== Personnel ==
Adapted from liner notes.

- Graham Bright – electric guitar (25), guitar solo (13, 14)
- Zach Bryan – lead vocals (all tracks), acoustic guitar (1–5, 7, 8, 10–18, 20–34), bass drum (6, 29), electric guitar (6, 9, 16, 19), harmonica (5–7, 13, 15, 24), slide guitar (11, 21, 29)
- Caleb Buchfink – background vocals (23)
- Dune Butler – Fender Jazz Bass (25), Juno synth (25), Moog synth (25), upright bass (25)
- J.R. Carroll – percussion (25), background vocals (3, 13–15, 25, 27)
- Taylor Carroll – percussion (25)
- Aksel Coe – drums (2–5, 7–12, 14–22, 24, 26–28, 30–33), percussion (3, 5, 7, 9, 13, 14, 16–19, 21, 24, 26), background vocals (13, 27, 30)
- Whitney Coleman – background vocals (11)
- Read Connolly – banjo (1), lap steel guitar (8), pedal steel guitar (3, 10, 19, 30), slide guitar (12)
- Billy Contreras – fiddle (4, 9, 10, 17, 18, 28, 30–32)
- Jeff Fielder – electric guitar (25), slide guitar (25)
- Ryan Hadlock – percussion (25)
- Calvin Knowles – bass guitar (4, 5, 7, 8, 14, 15, 17, 19–21, 24, 26, 30), synth bass (2, 11, 19), upright bass (2, 3, 10, 12, 13, 18, 22, 27, 28, 31–33), background vocals (13, 27)
- William Map – drums (25), percussion (25)
- Morgan Meinert – background vocals (7)
- Kimo Muraki – baritone horn (25), mellophone (25)
- Lucas Ruge-Jones – fiddle (15, 22, 23, 27), background vocals (22)
- Eddie Spear – piano (19, 29), background vocals (13, 27)
- Seth Taylor – acoustic guitar (3–5, 7–10, 13, 15, 17, 19–22, 24, 26, 27, 30, 31, 33), banjo (33), electric guitar (7–11, 14, 18–21, 26, 28, 31, 32), mandolin (12, 15, 27, 31, 32), background vocals (13, 22, 30)
- Brooke Waggoner – piano (2, 10, 18)

== Charts ==
=== Weekly charts ===
Weekly chart performance for American Heartbreak
Chart (2022–2025)	Peak position
Australian Albums (ARIA)	54
Australian Country Albums (ARIA)	5
Canadian Albums (Billboard)	4
Irish Albums (Official Charts)	1
New Zealand Albums (RMNZ)	40
UK Americana Albums (Official Charts)	3
UK Country Albums (Official Charts)	10
US Billboard 200	5
US Americana/Folk Albums (Billboard)	1
US Top Country Albums (Billboard)	1
US Top Rock Albums (Billboard)	1

=== Year-end charts ===
2022 year-end chart performance for American Heartbreak
Chart (2022)	Position
US Billboard 200	54
US Top Americana/Folk Albums (Billboard)	4
US Top Country Albums (Billboard)	8
US Top Rock Albums (Billboard)	4

2023 year-end chart performance for American Heartbreak
Chart (2023)	Position
Canadian Albums (Billboard)	9
US Billboard 200	8
US Top Country Albums (Billboard)	3
US Top Rock Albums (Billboard)	1

2024 year-end chart performance for American Heartbreak
Chart (2024)	Position
Australian Albums (ARIA)	94
Australian Country Albums (ARIA)	12
Canadian Albums (Billboard)	12
US Billboard 200	13
US Top Country Albums (Billboard)	4

2025 year-end chart performance for American Heartbreak
Chart (2025)	Position
Canadian Albums (Billboard)	25
US Billboard 200	31
US Top Country Albums (Billboard)	7
US Top Rock & Alternative Albums (Billboard)	4

== Certifications ==
Certifications for American Heartbreak
Region	Certification	Certified units/sales
Canada (Music Canada)	6× Platinum	480,000^{‡}
New Zealand (RMNZ)	2× Platinum	30,000^{‡}
United Kingdom (BPI)	Gold	100,000^{‡}
United States (RIAA)	3× Platinum	1,500,000^{‡}
^{‡} Sales+streaming figures based on certification alone.
