= University High School (West Virginia) =

Location
- 131 Bakers Ridge Road; Morgantown, (Monongalia County), WV 26508; United States; 39°41′15″N 79°55′42″W

Information
- Type: Public
- Established: 1925
- School district: Monongalia County Schools
- Principal: Kimberly Greene
- Teaching staff: 86.00 (FTE)
- Grades: 9–12
- Enrollment: 1,371 (2024–2025)
- Student to teacher ratio: 15.94
- Campus type: Urban
- Colors: Crimson, old gold, and black
- Athletics: Football, boys/girls-Cross Country, boys/girls-Soccer, Golf, boys/girls-Basketball, Wrestling, boys/girls-Swimming, boys/girls-Tennis, boys/girl-Track, Baseball, Softball, boys/girls-Lacrosse, Cheerleading, and Dance, Volleyball
- Mascot: Hawk
- Information: (304) 291-9270
- Website: hawks.mono.k12.wv.us

University High School is a senior high school in unincorporated Monongalia County, West Virginia, near Morgantown. A part of Monongalia County Schools, it houses just over 1,250 students. It is a part of the Monongalia County Schools. Students largely come from the 2 feeder schools, Mountaineer Middle School (formerly Cheat Lake Middle School), and Westwood Middle School.

In addition to sections of Morgantown, the school serves the City of Westover.

== History ==
=== Founding ===
The school was established by West Virginia University in September 1925 as University Demonstration High School. It was not uncommon in the south for colleges to found "demonstration schools", ostensibly as a place for students to learn educational techniques, but also because many professors were unwilling to send their children to public schools of that era.

It was originally located in the Old Tea Room on the corner of Willey and Spruce Streets. The school had 35 students and three teachers, and quickly attracted more. In 1928, strained with over two hundred students, the school was relocated to the third and fourth floors of a building on the corner of Stewart Street and University Avenue. In 1930, construction on University Demonstration High began. The school occupied the old library on the West Virginia University Campus until 1933, when the building was complete, at an estimated cost of $283,837, the school is located at the top of North Price Street.

=== Public ===
When, in 1972, West Virginia University no longer had need of the demonstration school, it was turned over to the Monongalia County Public School System. Morgantown High School district was divided and University High School was established as a second regular public high school. The school underwent major renovations and refurbishment, including the addition of a gymnasium and annex.

In 2006, construction began on a new campus for University High. This new facility, part of a bond issue passed by the citizens of Monongalia County in 2003, is located north of Morgantown along Bakers Ridge Road. The $35 million project includes a two-story classroom building, a greenhouse, a 2000-seat gymnasium, a 400-seat auxiliary gymnasium and an approximately 700 seat auditorium. In addition to the building, the campus also includes a new 4000 seat stadium for field sports, as well as multiple athletic and physical education fields. The building was designed by the award-winning Charleston WV architectural firm of Williamson Shriver Architects.

While the football team played its 2008 home games at the new high school (Mylan Pharmaceuticals Stadium), students did not arrive at the new University High until December 2008. On Wednesday, November 19, 2008 the old school on Price Street welcomed students for the last time, and students started school at the new location on December 3, 2008. Just after a few days, the building experienced minor flooding as a result of a heating issue that activated the sprinkler system.

The building that once held University High School now houses Mountaineer Middle School, formerly Cheat Lake Middle School.

== Academic Program ==
University High School offers 24 Advanced Placement courses, one of the largest AP programs in West Virginia.

== Athletics ==
The University Hawks compete in the AAA class of the WVSSAC. They are members of the Two Rivers Athletic Conference (TRAC) which is a sub-conference of the Ohio Valley Athletic Conference (OVAC). The Hawks have enjoyed a long and intense rivalry with Morgantown High School.

=== State championships ===
- Wrestling - 1956, 2024
  - Individual State Champion: Joe Panico
  - Individual State Champion: Derek Jefferson
  - Individual State Champion: Jesse Schiffbauer
  - Individual State Champion: Jon Waldron
  - Individual State Champion: Kyle Turnbull
  - Individual State Champion: David Campbell
  - Individual State Champion: Luca Felix (2022)
  - Individual State Champion: Brock Kehler (2022)
- Boys Cross Country - 2006, 2013, 2014, 2020, 2021, 2022, 2023, 2024, 2025
  - Individual State Champion: Ryan Scotnicki - 2004
  - Individual State Champion: Seth Edwards - 2014, 2015
  - Individual State Champion: Philip White - 2016
  - Individual State Champion: Larry Edwards - 2019, 2020, 2021
- Girls Cross Country - 2007, 2008, 2010, 2014, 2015, 2016, 2017, 2018, 2019, 2024
  - Individual State Champion: Amber Riley - 2006
  - Individual State Champion: Millie Paladino - 2012, 2013
- Girls Soccer - 2009, 2010, 2016
- Golf - 2012
- Boys Lacrosse - 2011, 2013, 2014, 2015, 2017, 2018
- Girls Lacrosse - 2014, 2024, 2025
- Boys Basketball - 2019
- Boys Track - 2022
- Girls Tennis - 2023
- Softball - 2024

=== State Runner-Up ===
- Wrestling - 1955, 2022
- Football - 1994
- Girls Cross Country - 2009, 2011, 2012, 2019, 2020, 2021, 2022, 2023
- Boys Cross Country - 2012, 2015, 2019
- Golf - 2006
- Girls Soccer - 2008, 2017
- Boys Lacrosse - 2008, 2010
- Girls Lacrosse - 2016
- Boys Soccer - 2016, 2020
- Girls Basketball - 2019
- Girls Tennis - 2024

== Notable alumni ==
- Rich Braham, '89 – retired football center for the Cincinnati Bengals
- Sarah Culberson – philanthropist and Mende princess
- Jedd Gyorko, '07 – former professional baseball player for the Milwaukee Brewers
- Josh Judy, '04 – former professional baseball player for the Cleveland Indians
- Rob Mullens, '87 – current athletic director at the University of Oregon
- Skylar Neese – murdered while a student in 2012
- Tyler Wells, '13 – pitcher for the Baltimore Orioles
