= Mylan =

Pharmaceutical company (Viatris since 2020)

Mylan N.V.
- Trade name: Mylan N.V.
- Formerly: Milan
- Type: Public (under Dutch law)
- Traded as: Nasdaq: MYL
- Industry: Pharmaceuticals
- Founded: 1961; 65 years ago in White Sulphur Springs, West Virginia, United States
- Founders: Milan Puskar; Don Panoz
- Defunct: November 16, 2020; 5 years ago
- Fate: Merged with Upjohn to form Viatris
- Successor: Viatris
- Headquarters: Hatfield, Hertfordshire, United Kingdom
- Products: Generic and specialty pharmaceuticals and active pharmaceutical ingredients
- Divisions: see Operations
- Website: www.mylan.com

Mylan N.V. was a global generic and specialty pharmaceuticals company. In November 2020, Mylan merged with Upjohn, Pfizer's off-patent medicine division, to form Viatris. Previously, the company was domiciled in the Netherlands, with principal executive offices in Hatfield, Hertfordshire, UK and a "Global Center" in Canonsburg, Pennsylvania, US.

In 2007, the company acquired a controlling interest in India-based Matrix Laboratories Limited, a top producer of active pharmaceutical ingredients (APIs) for generic drugs, and the generics business of Germany-based Merck KGaA. Through these acquisitions, the company grew from the third-largest generic and specialty pharmaceuticals company in the United States to the second-largest generic and specialty pharmaceuticals company in the world.

Mylan went public on the OTC market in February 1973. It was listed on the NASDAQ, and its shares were a component of the NASDAQ Biotechnology and the S&P 500 indices.

The company was founded in 1961 and developed and produced medicines for a wide range of medical disciplines, including oncology, anaphylaxis, antiretrovirals, cardiovascular, respiratory, dermatology, immunology, anesthesia and pain management, infectious disease, gastroenterology, diabetology/endocrinology, and women's healthcare.

== Corporate headquarters ==
Founded in 1961, the company was located in an abandoned skating rink in White Sulphur Springs, West Virginia. The facility was moved to Pennsauken, New Jersey in 1962, to Princeton, West Virginia in 1963, and then Morgantown, West Virginia, in 1965, and in 1976 it relocated its corporate headquarters to the Pittsburgh suburb Canonsburg, Pennsylvania. Finally in 2004 it moved to a new office center in nearby Southpointe, a suburban business park located in the Pittsburgh suburb of Cecil Township.

== Stock ==
On February 23, 1973, Mylan had its initial public offering (IPO), when it became a publicly traded company on the OTC market under the ticker symbol MYLN. In 1976 the stock moved to the National Association of Securities Dealers Automated Quotations (NASDAQ). Their final stock move was in 1986, when their stock became available for trade on the New York Stock Exchange under the ticker symbol MYL. Prior to the Viatris combination, the stock was traded on the NASDAQ.

== History ==
=== Founding to 1980 ===
Mylan Pharmaceuticals was founded as a drug distributor in 1961 by Milan Puskar and Don Panoz. In 1966, the company began manufacturing penicillin G tablets as well as vitamins and other dietary supplements.

Panoz left the company in 1969 and Puskar quit the company in 1973, as it grew and experienced financial difficulties. The board hired Roy McKnight as board chairman, who convinced Puskar to return in 1976.

The company discontinued operating as a contract manufacturing organization in 1980 and instead chose to market their products under their own "Mylan-labeled" brand.

=== 1980s ===
With the passage of the Hatch-Waxman Act in 1984, the company and other small generic companies gained value; in the eighteen months following passage of the law the company's earnings grew 166% to $12.5 million and its stock value rose 800%.

==== Dyazide & Maxzide ====
In the 1980s one of the most prescribed drugs in the US was Dyazide, a diuretic that was a combination drug containing triamterene and hydrochlorothiazide; it had been on the market since 1965 and its patents had expired in 1980. Complications arose with the introductions of generics versions, because the formulation of Dyazide resulted in variable batches that made it impossible for generic manufacturers to show that their versions were bioequivalent.

Some generic companies committed fraud trying to bring a generic version of Dyazide. Bolar Pharmaceutical had the first generic version approved in 1987, but it turned out that Bolar had fraudulently substituted Dyazide for its own version to conduct studies that were submitted to the FDA. By 1989 the FDA rescinded its approval based on its suspicions and filed criminal charges against Bolar, to which Bolar eventually pled guilty in 1991.

The company chose to develop a new version of a triamterene/hydrochlorothiazide combination drug instead of going the generic route; it developed a different, more stable formulation and used different dosages of each active ingredient (50 mg hydrochlorothiazide and 75 mg triamterene, compared with Dyazide's 25 mg hydrochlorothiazide and 50 mg triamterene). This drug had to get approval as a new drug, as opposed to a generic. Their product was called Maxzide and was approved in 1984. The higher dose allowed once per day dosing, which the company and its marketing partner, Lederle, believed would help it compete against Dyazide, which had $210M in sales in 1983. However, the company's patents on the drug were declared invalid in court, and its marketing exclusivity expired in 1987, prompting a rush of generic competition.

The company had concerns about the practices of its competitors and the FDA in general, and also with regard to companies seeking to bring generic versions of Maxzide. The company hired private investigators to examine its competitors' practices, and when it found evidence of corruption, it submitted it to the House Oversight and Investigations Committee, which investigated and found fraud and corruption within the Food and Drug Administration's generic drugs division and at other generic companies. Two of the companies that had gotten approval to market generic versions of Maxzide, Vitarine Pharmaceutical and Par Pharmaceutical, were targets of the company's initial investigation and were found to have used Maxzide to obtain their bioequivalence data, leading both companies to withdraw its generic competitor to Mylan's product.

The corruption in the nascent generics industry and at the office in the FDA regulating it was widely covered in the media, and led to widespread concern among doctors and the public in the late 1980s and early 1990s that generic drugs were not really the same as the branded drugs they were meant to replace.

==== Acquisitions begin ====
In 1987, the company entered into a joint venture with Bolar to buy Somerset Pharmaceuticals; Mylan wanted access to Somersets' drug discovery capabilities as well as its new drug for Parkinson's, selegiline; the deal was completed in 1988 but its consummation was dependent on FDA approval of selegiline, which came in 1989.

=== 1990s ===
The company acquired Bertek Inc. in 1993 for its transdermal patch technologies, and kept it as a subsidiary. In 1999, the company renamed Bertek as Mylan Technologies Inc. (MTI). MTI eventually came to be the contract manufacturer for the selegiline transdermal patch and was the first company to market generic nitroglycerin, estradiol, clonidine, and fentanyl transdermal patches.

In 1996, the company acquired UDL Laboratories, a supplier of unit dose generic medications to institutional and long-term care facilities.

In 1998 when it was the world's second largest generics company, the company came under investigation from the Federal Trade Commission after it raised the prices of its products, tripling them in the case of lorazepam. The company had entered into an exclusive agreement with Profarmica, an Italian company that supplied drug ingredients, after which the company's competitors had higher prices and a diminished supply of raw ingredients for lorazepam and other drugs. Before the round of price increases the price of generic drugs had been 5 - 10% of the price of branded drugs and afterwards it was around 50%. The FTC filed suit at the end of 1998 and 32 states filed parallel actions. The case was settled in 2000, with the company paying a total of $147M -- $100M in disgorged profits into a fund to reimburse consumers and state agencies that had overpaid, $8 million in attorney's fees to the State Attorneys General, $35 million, plus $4 million in attorney's fees, to settle certain class actions with insurers and managed care organizations—and Mylan and three ingredient suppliers (Cambrex Corporation, Profarmaco S.R.L., and Gyma Laboratories) also agreed to an injunction barring them from entering into similar anticompetitive agreements in the future.

=== 2000s ===
==== Attempted King Pharmaceuticals acquisition ====
In 2004, the company and King Pharmaceuticals began discussing a deal in which Mylan would acquire King for $4 billion; Mylan wanted to expand its presence in branded pharmaceuticals and to acquire King's sales force. The deal was complicated by a number of factors, and included an SEC investigation into King's accounting and Carl Icahn obtaining a 9.8% interest in Mylan and becoming its largest stakeholder in order to kill the deal. The parties called off the deal in February 2005. Afterwards, Icahn offered to buy Mylan for $5.4 billion and nominated a slate of board members to change the direction of Mylan; he won three seats in May 2005. In June, the company bought back 25% of its shares in order to fend off Icahn. In July, Icahn gave up his bid and sold his shares.

==== Matrix acquisition ====
In January 2007, the company acquired a controlling interest in Matrix Laboratories, an Indian supplier of active pharmaceutical ingredients, for approximately $736 million, with the takeover including all of Matrix's subsidiary firms, for example Docpharma. It was at the time the largest-ever takeover in the Indian pharma industry and also gave access to markets in China, India, and Africa.

==== EpiPen acquisition ====
In October 2007, the company acquired the generics division of Merck KGaA for $6.6 billion. The company acquired the rights to market the EpiPen in the transaction. At that time annual sales were around $200 million and the EpiPen had about 90% of the market.

In 2009, the company filed two lawsuits against the Pittsburgh Post-Gazette after the newspaper ran an article that was critical of the quality control procedures used at the company's Morgantown plant. The company had earlier quality control issues involving the FDA. The lawsuits were dropped in 2012 without any damages paid by the Post-Gazette, which stated "The Post-Gazette did not find and did not intend to report that Mylan had manufactured or distributed any defective drugs. The Post-Gazette regrets if any reader of the article thought otherwise."

Also in 2009, the company and its subsidiary UDL agreed to pay $118 million to settle a suit filed under the False Claims Act in which Mylan/UDL and two other companies were accused of underpaying states under the Medicaid Drug Rebate Program. The program requires drug companies to give rebates to states under Medicaid and the rebates are higher for new drugs than for generics; the suit said that the companies sold new drugs but paid rebates as if they were generics.

=== 2010s ===
==== Generic Advair agreement ====
In 2011, the company entered into an agreement with Pfizer for the exclusive worldwide rights to develop, manufacture and commercialize Pfizer's generic equivalent to GlaxoSmithKline's Advair (US)/Seretide (UK) Diskus incorporating Pfizer's proprietary dry powder inhaler delivery platform. The company launched the product in the UK in 2015 and in February 2016 the FDA accepted its ANDA, putting it in line behind Hikma and Sandoz to launch a generic version in the US.

==== EpiPen4Schools launch ====
In 2012, the company launched a program called EpiPen4Schools to sell EpiPens in bulk and with discounts to schools. To participate in the program schools had to agree not to buy epinephrine autoinjectors from any other company for a year, a requirement which a company spokesperson said is no longer part of its program.

In December 2012, the National Association of State Boards of Education launched a policy initiative designed to "help state boards of education as they develop student health policies regarding anaphylaxis and epinephrine auto-injector access and use", and advocated for state laws protecting schools from legal liability for stocking and using epinephrine autoinjectors. Gayle Manchin, the mother of the company's CEO, Heather Bresch, had become president of the association in 2010, and shortly after had discussed donations from her "daughter's company" to the association. Manchin had been appointed to the West Virginia state school board by her husband, then-governor of the state Joe Manchin, in 2007. In a statement, the company said, "There is no truth to the suggestion that the company's efforts were anything but straightforward or that we are aware of anyone advocating inappropriately for the right of schoolchildren to have access to potential life-saving medicine."

After successful lobbying from the company, in 2013, the "School Access to Emergency Epinephrine Act" became law after passing Congress with broad and bipartisan support; it protected anyone from liability if they administered epinephrine to a child in a school (previously, only trained professionals or the affected person were allowed to administer the drug, and were open to liability), and it provided some financial incentives for schools that didn't already stock epinephrine autoinjector to start stocking them. Joe Manchin, the father of Mylan's CEO, was a senator at that time.

==== Agila acquisition ====
Mylan executives lobbied for the Generic Drug User Fee Amendments of 2012 to have generic drug manufacturers fund increased FDA investigations of offshore manufacturing plants. The following year, it purchased Agila Specialties Private, an Indian company specializing in generic injectable drugs, for $1.6 billion. When three Mylan plants, two of which were acquired from Agila, were censured over the following two years due to contamination issues, the Agila acquisition was criticized as corrupting Mylan's prior commitment to quality control.

==== Abbott acquisition ====
In February 2015, in a tax inversion, the company acquired the generic drugs business in developed markets of Abbott Laboratories for $5.3 billion in stock.

Also in February 2015, the company acquired Mumbai-based Famy Care and expand its presence in the market for women's contraceptives at about $750 million.

==== Attempted Perrigo acquisition ====
In April 2015, the company attempted a hostile takeover of Perrigo, offering to buy $26 billion in shares directly from shareholders. Too few shareholders agreed to sell their stock by the deadline set in November 2015 and the effort failed.

==== Attempted purchase by Teva ====
Two weeks after the company made its first offer for Perrigo, Teva Pharmaceuticals offered to buy the company for $40 billion; the combined companies would have been the world's largest generic company and the 9th biggest drug company in the world. In July, Teva dropped its bid for Mylan and instead acquired Allergan's generic drug business for about the same price.

==== New COPD drug ====
In June 2015, the company agreed to work with Pulmatrix, a company with a proprietary inhaled drug delivery platform, to co-develop a product to treat for chronic obstructive pulmonary disease (COPD); the product was PUR0200, a generic drug in a Pulmatrix device.

==== Meda acquisition ====
In February 2016, the company announced it would acquire Meda AB for $9.9 billion. In May 2016, the company announced it would acquire Renaissance Acquisition Holdings dermatology division for up to $1 billion.

In December 2016, the State attorneys general of 20 states filed a civil complaint accusing the company of a coordinated scheme to artificially maintain high prices for a generic antibiotic and diabetes drug. The complaint alleged price collusion schemes between six pharmaceutical firms including informal gatherings, telephone calls, and text messages.

In October 2017, the company announced the launch of the first FDA-approved generic of Teva's long-acting Copaxone. Approximately three months later, Credit Suisse analyst Vamil Divan cited IMS Health data which showed that the new generic accounted for 10% of the market.

In May 2018, the company announced a collaboration with West Virginia University to provide children across West Virginia with STEM education.

==== Valsartan recall ====
In 2018, valsartan manufactured by the company was voluntarily recalled due to the detection of trace amounts of N-nitrosodiethylamine (NDEA) which is a probable human carcinogen.

==== Generic Advair approval ====
In January 2019, the FDA announced its approval of the company's Wixela Inhub, the first approved generic version of GlaxoSmithKline's Advair Diskus.

==== Merger with Pfizer's off-patent drug business and name change to Viatris ====
In late July 2019, the company and Pfizer announced that Pfizer would spin off and merge its off-patent medicine division, Upjohn, with Mylan.

In November 2019, Mylan & Upjohn announced that the name of the new company would be Viatris. The company continued sales of Mylan's more than 7,500 products, including biosimilars, generics, brand and over-the-counter remedies, with brands including the Epi-Pen, Viagra, Lipitor and Celebrex.

The deal was structured as an all-stock, Reverse Morris Trust transaction. Pfizer shareholders owned 57% of the combined new company and Mylan shareholders owned 43%.

=== Stock ===
On February 23, 1973, the company became a public company via an initial public offering (IPO), on the OTC market. In 1976, the stock moved to NASDAQ and in 1986, it moved to the New York Stock Exchange, then later back to NASDAQ.

=== Acquisition history ===
The following is an illustration of the company's major mergers and acquisitions and historical predecessors:

Mylan Acquisitions
- Mylan (Founded 1961)
  - Somerset Pharmaceuticals (Acq 1989)
  - Dow B. Hickam (Acq 1991)
  - Bertek Inc (Acq 1993)
  - UDL Laboratories (Acq 1996)
  - Penederm Inc (Acq 1998)
  - Matrix Laboratories (Acq 2007)
  - Merck KGaA (Generics div.) (Acq 2007)
  - Bioniche Pharma Holdings (Acq 2010)
  - Pfizer Respiratory Delivery Platform (Acq 2011)
  - Agila Specialties (Acq 2013)
  - Abbott Laboratories (Generics div.) (Acq 2014)
  - Famy Care (Acq 2014)
  - Meda (Acq 2016)
  - Renaissance Acquisition Holdings (Dermatology div.) (Acq 2016)

== Criticism ==
=== EpiPen pricing ===
Mylan acquired the right to market and distribute the EpiPen line of epinephrine autoinjector devices from Merck KGaA as part of their 2007 deal; that right had formerly been held by Dey LP, a wholly owned subsidiary of Merck. According to Bloomberg News, the devices deliver about $1 worth of drug. At that time annual sales were around $200 million. Bresch, the company's CEO, saw an opportunity to increase sales through marketing and advocacy, and the company launched a marketing campaign to increase awareness of the dangers of anaphylaxis for people with severe allergies that made the brand "EpiPen" as identified with its product as "Kleenex" is with facial tissue. The company also successfully lobbied the FDA to broaden the label to include risk of anaphylaxis and in parallel, successfully lobbied Congress to generate legislation making EpiPens available in schools and in public places like defibrillators are, and hired the same people that Medtronic had worked with on defibrillator legislation to do so. Mylan's efforts to gain market dominance were aided when Sanofi's competing product was recalled in November 2015 and further when Teva's generic competitor was rejected by the FDA in March 2016.

By the first half of 2015, Mylan had an 85% market share of such devices in the US and in that year sales reached around $1.5 billion and accounted for 40% of Mylan's profit. Those profits were also due in part to Mylan's continually raising the price of EpiPens starting in 2009; in 2009 the wholesale price of two EpiPens was about $100, by July 2013 the price was about $265, in May 2015 it was around $461, and in May 2016 the price rose again to around $609, around a 500% jump from the price in 2009.

Starting in 2014, according to a 2017 report in the New York Times, mid-level executives began questioning the rate at which the company had increased and was planning to continue to increase the price of the Epi-Pen, and raising concerns that the price increases were unethical; the Times reported that when these concerns were brought to Robert Coury, the chairman of the board, Coury "replied that he was untroubled. He raised both his middle fingers and explained, using colorful language, that anyone criticizing Mylan, including its employees, ought to go copulate with themselves. Critics in Congress and on Wall Street, he said, should do the same. And regulators at the Food and Drug Administration? They, too, deserved a round of anatomically challenging self-fulfillment." The Times reported that Bresch provided similarly dismissive responses. The reporter noted that "Those top leaders' responses are a far cry from the message on Mylan's website, which says that 'we challenge every member of every team to challenge the status quo,' and that 'we put people and patients first, trusting that profits will follow'", and also noted that "The firm is a case study in the limits of what consumer and employee activism, as well as government oversight, can achieve."

In the summer of 2016, as parents prepared to send their children back to school and went to pharmacies to get new EpiPens, people began to express outrage at the cost of the EpiPen and the company was widely and harshly criticized, including criticism from Martin Shkreli, "poster boy for grasping pharma greed", letters from two senators and initiation of Congressional investigations. Mylan's pricing of the EpiPen was widely referred to as price gouging. The last price increase coincided with the company's airing of a new line of TV commercials that were described as "shocking" and "no holds barred", depicting an anaphylactic reaction from the point of view of the young woman having it at a party, and ending with the young woman seeing her swollen and hive-covered face in the mirror before she collapses. In response to criticism, the company increased financial assistance available for some patients to purchase EpiPens, a gesture that was called a "classic public relations move" by Harvard Medical School professor Aaron Kesselheim. The up to $300 saving cards can only be used by a small number of people who need the drug, and no one on Medicaid. They do nothing about the high price, he said, which is still being paid by insurers, who ultimately pass the cost onto consumers. The company further responded by releasing the first authorized generic version of the EpiPen in December 2016 at a more than 50% discount.

In September 2016, the New York State Attorney General began an investigation into the company's EpiPen4Schools program in New York to determine if the program's contracts violated antitrust law and the West Virginia State Attorney General opened an investigation into whether Mylan had given the state the correct discount under the Medicaid Drug Rebate Program and subpoenaed the company when it refused to provide the documentation the state requested.

In October 2016, the CEO of the company testified to Congress that Pfizer/King charged the company about $34.50 for one device. In September 2016, a Silicon Valley engineering consultancy performed a teardown analysis of the EpiPen and estimated the manufacturing and packaging costs at about $10 for a two-pack.

According to the Department of Health and Human Services' Office of Inspector General analysis, the U.S. government may have overpaid "as much as $1.27 billion between 2006 and 2016" to the company for the EpiPen emergency allergy treatment. This represents three times the proposed settlement of $465 million announced by the company in October 2016. In October 2016, the company announced a settlement with the US Department of Justice over rebates paid by the company to states under the Medicaid Drug Rebate Program. Questions had been raised by Congress and others about why EpiPen had been classified as a generic rather a proprietary product in the program since 1997; generic drugs have lower rebates (13%) than proprietary drugs (23%), and price hikes for generic drugs cannot be passed onto states, and a common form of pharmaceutical fraud involves misclassifying proprietary drugs as generic under the program. Under the agreement, the company agreed to pay a $465 million payment and to sign a corporate integrity agreement requiring it to perform better in the future; the settlement also resolved cases brought by states related to the rebates. Simultaneously with the settlement, the company also announced it was being investigated by the Securities and Exchange Commission related to the drug rebate program. Republican Senator Chuck Grassley, chair of the Senate Judiciary Committee that launched the "probe of EpiPen pricing probe in 2016, released the analysis on May 30, 2017.

=== Executive pay ===
In a report published on June 12, 2017 Institutional Shareholder Services criticized the company for the "outsized compensation" of its directors. Former CEO Robert Coury received a $98 million 2016 pay package in spite of shareholder losses and the perceived harm to the company inflicted by the EpiPen controversies. The report urged the company's shareholders to oust all of the existing directors.

=== Execution drugs ===
The company manufactures rocuronium bromide, which is approved by the state of Alabama for use in executions by lethal injection. European manufacturers refuse to sell drugs which can be used for executions to the United States, except to distributors or users who sign legally binding agreements that the drug will not be used for executions down the delivery chain.

In September 2014, the London-based human rights organisation Reprieve told Mylan that it was the only FDA-approved manufacturer of rocuronium bromide without legal controls in place to prevent its use in executions, and there was "a very real risk that Mylan may soon become the go-to provider of execution drugs for states across the country". German asset manager DJE Kapital divested itself of $70 million in Mylan shares for that reason. The company said that its distribution was "legally compliant", and that their restrictions did "prohibit resale to correctional facilities for use in lethal injections".

== Products ==
=== Generic Medicines ===
Name	Indication	Year Introduced
Penicillin G tablets	Antibiotic	1966
Tetracycline	Antibiotic	1968
Cimetidine	Ulcer	1994
Cipro (Ciprofloxacin)	Antibiotic	2004

=== Branded Medicines ===
Name	Indication	Year Introduced
Maxzide	Blood pressure	1984
Eldepryl	Parkinson's	1989
EpiPen	Allergy	2007

== Management ==
Heather Bresch was an executive director and the CEO of Mylan from 2012 until the Viatris combination in 2020. Robert Coury was chairman, and Rajiv Malik was president.
