= Heading South (song) =

2019 single by Zach Bryan

Single by Zach Bryan

from the album Elisabeth
- Released: September 30, 2019
- Genre: Alternative country
- Length: 3:30
- Label: Warner
- Songwriter: Zach Bryan
- Producer: Leo Alba

Zach Bryan singles chronology
"Heading South" (2019)	"Oklahoma City" (2020)

Music video
- "Heading South" on YouTube

"Heading South" is a song by American singer-songwriter Zach Bryan. It was released on September 30, 2019, as his debut single from his second studio album Elisabeth, which was released on May 8, 2020. The song was written by Bryan, and produced by Leo Alba.

== Content ==
The song was originally released in 2019, but in 2020, it garnered attention on the internet, gaining over 30 million plays on Spotify. Bryan stated that he recorded the song behind his barracks when he served in the United States Navy.

== Music video ==
The music video was shot in his Navy barracks on his phone. As of September 2024, the video has received over 30 million views.

== Commercial performance ==
It reached number 27 on the Billboard Hot Rock & Alternative Songs chart dated March 13, 2021, becoming Bryan's first entry. On November 4, 2021, the song obtained RIAA Gold certification.

== Charts ==
=== Weekly charts ===
Weekly chart performance for "Heading South"
Chart (2021–2024)	Peak position
Ireland (IRMA)	44
Sweden Heatseeker (Sverigetopplistan)	9
US Hot Rock & Alternative Songs (Billboard)	27

=== Year-end charts ===
Year-end chart performance for "Heading South"
Chart (2021)	Position
US Hot Rock & Alternative Songs (Billboard)	80

== Certifications ==
Certifications for "Heading South"
Region	Certification	Certified units/sales
Australia (ARIA)	2× Platinum	140,000^{‡}
Canada (Music Canada)	9× Platinum	720,000^{‡}
New Zealand (RMNZ)	3× Platinum	90,000^{‡}
United Kingdom (BPI)	Platinum	600,000^{‡}
United States (RIAA)	6× Platinum	6,000,000^{‡}
^{‡} Sales+streaming figures based on certification alone.
